= Demographics of Quebec =

Demographics of region

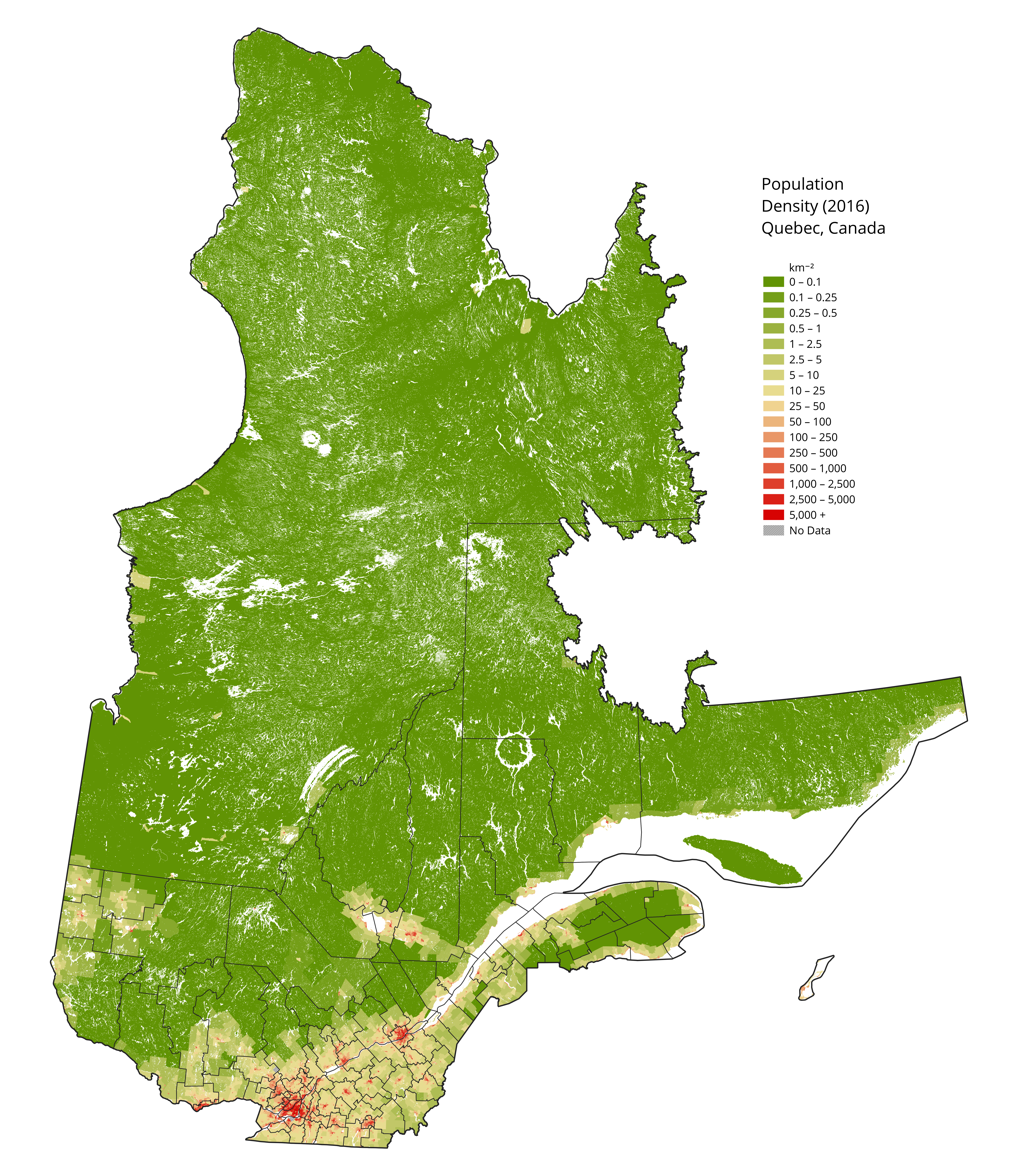
Canada Quebec Density 2016

The demographics of Quebec describes a province with a population estimated to be 9,058,297 (2025). In the 2021 census, Quebec's population was determined to be 8,501,833 living in 3,749,035 of its 4,050,164 total dwellings, a 4.1% change from its 2016 population of 8,164,361. With a land area of 1,298,599.75 km^{2} (501,392.17 sq mi), it had a population density of 6.5/km^{2} (17.0/sq mi) in 2016. Quebec accounts for a little under 23% of the Canadian population. Quebec's demographic weight in Canada has been gradually decreasing since 1971 when it was 28% of the population. In 2023, Quebec's three most populated regions are Montreal (2,109,525), Montérégie (1,492,662) and Capitale-Nationale (793,001). Quebec's three least populated regions are Nord-du-Québec (46,650), Côte-Nord (89,914) and Gaspésie-Îles-de-la-Madeleine (92,059).

Quebec is the only one of Canada's provinces to feature a Francophone (French-speaking) majority, and where anglophones (English-speakers) are an officially recognized minority group. According to the 2011 census, French is spoken by more than 85.5% of the population including 88% of children under 15 years old. According to the 2011 census, 95% of Quebec's people are able to converse in French, with fewer than 5% of the population not able to speak French.

Quebec is home to "one of the world's most valuable founder populations". Founder populations are valuable to genetic medical research as they feature low genetic variability that provides a useful research context for discovering gene-disease linkages. The Quebec founder population arose through the influx of people into Quebec from France in the 17th century to mid-18th century; a high proportion of the settlers either returned to France or died. Of the approximately 33,500 colonists who arrived to Canada, fewer than 10,000 remained. Approximately 8,500 colonists who settled from France and had at least one child in the colony. About seven million Canadians (along with several million French Americans in the United States) are descendants of these original 8,500 colonists.

As of the 2021 census, Quebec's population of 8,501,833, was a 4.1% increase from its 2016 population of 8,164,361. With a land area of 1,356,625.27 km^{2} (523,795.95 sq mi), it had a population density of 6.0/km^{2} (15.6/sq mi) in 2016. Quebec accounted for a little under 23% of the Canadian population. The largest cities in Quebec are Montreal (1,762,976), Quebec City (538,738), Laval (431,208), and Gatineau (281,501).

In 2016, Quebec's median age was 41.2 years. As of 2020, 20.8% of the population was younger than 20, 59.5% was aged between 20 and 64, and 19.7% was 65 or older. In 2019, Quebec witnessed an increase in the number of births compared to the year before (84,200 vs 83,840) and had a total fertility rate of about 1.6 children born per woman. As of 2020, the average life expectancy was 82.3 years. Quebec in 2019 registered its highest rate of population growth since 1972, with an increase of 110,000 people, mostly because of the arrival of a high number of immigrants. As of 2019, most international immigrants were from China, India and France. In 2016, 30% of the population possessed a postsecondary degree or diploma. Most residents, particularly couples, are property owners. In 2016, 80% of both property owners and renters considered their housing to be "unaffordable". In the 2021 Canadian census, 29.3% of Quebec's population stated their ancestry was of Canadian origin and 21.1% stated their ancestry was of French origin. As of 2021, 18% of Quebec's population belonged to a visible minority group.

== Vital statistics ==
While Quebec's fertility rate is higher than the Canadian average, it has been sharply decreasing in the past 15 years. At 1.38 children per woman in 2008, it is above the Canada-wide rate of 1.26, and is just above the historic low of 1.36 in 1987. This contrasts with its fertility rates before 1960, which were among the highest of any industrialized society. For example, between 1951 and 1961, the population grew nearly 30% with only small net migration (large number of international migrants had settled in Quebec in the preceding period but large numbers of Quebec residents had emigrated to other provinces as well as New England), a natural growth rate matched today only by some African countries.

Although Quebec is home to only 22.0% of the population of Canada, the number of international adoptions in Quebec is the highest of all provinces of Canada. In 2001, 42% of international adoptions in Canada were carried out in Quebec.

Population growth rate: 2.5% (2023)

Birth rate: 8.8‰ (2023)

Synthetic fertility index: 1.38 (2023)

Death rate: 7.0‰ (2023)

Permanent immigration rate: 6.0‰ (2003)

Infant mortality rate: 0.46% (2023)

Life expectancy:

- total: 82.8 years
- male: 80.9 years
- female: 84.7 years (2019)

Urbanisation: In 2001, 80.4% of Quebecers lived in urban areas.

Marriages: In 2019, 22,250 marriages were celebrated, about 600 less than in 2017 and 2018. These numbers illustrate a continuing trend where marriages are becoming less numerous; in 1970, the number of marriages hit a peak with more than 50,000 celebrations and the number has been slowly decreasing ever since. The average age for marriage is now 33.5 for men and 32.1 for women, an increase of 8.0 and 8.5 years respectively since 1970. 72% of marriages occur on a Saturday. Half of all marriages unite a man and woman with an age gap of 3 years or less. Though they are still uncommon, civil unions are becoming more and more popular.

Demographic growth: In 2019, Quebec registered the highest rate of population growth since 1972 (when quality data began to be recorded), with an increase of 110,000 people, mostly because of the arrival of a high number of non-permanent residents. The number of non-permanent residents has recently sky-rocketed from a little over 100,000 in 2014 to 260,000 in 2019. Quebec's population growth is usually middle-of-the-pack compared to other provinces and very high compared to other developed countries (ex. United States, France, Germany, etc.) because of the federal government of Canada's aggressive immigration policies. Since the 1970s, Quebec has always had more immigrants than emigrants. This can be attributed to international immigration as the number of people moving to Quebec from another province is always lower than the other way around. As of 2019, most international immigrants come from China, India or France.

Education and work: In 2016, 3 out of 10 people in Quebec possessed a postsecondary degree or diploma. While women were more likely to have a university degree (33% vs 26%) or college degree (21% vs 11%), men were more numerous in having received vocational training. In Quebec, couples where both parents work are far more likely to have children than couples where only one parent works or none of them do.

Households: In Quebec, most people are owners of the property that they live in. The vast majority of couples with or without children are property owners. Most one-person households, however, are renters. Single-parent homes are equally divided between being property owners or renters. From 1996 to 2016, the number of people per household has decreased from an average of 2.5 to 2.25. In 2016, the vast majority of low income households were one-person households. In 2016, 80% of both property owners and renters considered their housing to be "unaffordable".

== Population centres ==
Ten most populated Quebec cities (2016)
Rank	City	Region	Population
1	Montreal	Montreal	1,762,976
2	Quebec	Capitale-Nationale	538,738
3	Laval	Laval	431,208
4	Gatineau	Outaouais	281,501
5	Longueuil	Montérégie	245,033
6	Sherbrooke	Estrie	165,005
7	Saguenay	Saguenay–Lac-Saint-Jean	144,989
8	Lévis	Chaudière-Appalaches	144,808
9	Trois-Rivières	Mauricie	135,863
10	Terrebonne	Lanaudière	113,226

== Age structure ==
Age structure: (2016 census)

Age groups	Total	% of population	Male	Female
0–4 years	444,930	5.45%	227,965	216,970
5–9 years	469,165	5.75%	240,225	228,940
10–14 years	419,160	5.13%	214,345	204,815
15–19 years	429,825	5.26%	219,070	210,755
20–24 years	500,100	6.13%	252,600	247,500
25–29 years	495,410	6.07%	248,030	247,380
30–34 years	515,505	6.31%	256,440	259,070
35–39 years	550,540	6.74%	274,595	275,945
40–44 years	506,525	6.20%	254,100	252,425
45–49 years	519,425	6.36%	260,410	259,015
50–54 years	619,435	7.59%	309,070	310,370
55–59 years	636,475	7.80%	314,190	322,285
60–64 years	562,670	6.89%	276,140	286,535
65–69 years	488,175	5.98%	236,395	251,775
70–74 years	373,590	4.58%	176,905	196,690
75–79 years	256,905	3.15%	116,020	140,890
80–84 years	187,835	2.30%	78,390	109,450
85 years and over	188,685	2.31%	61,885	126,805
Total	8,164,360	100%	4,016,760	4,147,605

In 2016, Quebec's median age was 41.2 years old. According to Quebec's age pyramid, the most numerous generation is the baby-boomers that are between 54 and 74 years of age. There are a few other less pronounced peaks, namely in the 1980s, and the one around 2010. A noticeable crater can be observed around the year 2000 because of a record-low amount of births. In 2020, 20.8% of the population is less than 20 years old, 59.5% are aged between 20 and 64 years old, and 19.7% are 65 years old or older. In 2019, Quebec witnessed an increase in the number of births compared to the year before (84,200 vs 83,840) and had a replacement rate of about 1.6 per woman. Replacement rates being below 2.1 something that is the norm in industrialised regions like Quebec. Quebec has a higher replacement rate than the Canadian average (1,47). Quebec's rate can also be both higher (ex. Switzerland (1.48), Portugal (1.42), Japan (1.36), Italy (1.29), etc.) or lower (ex. United States (1.73), New Zealand (1.75), Sweden (1.70), England (1.65), etc.) than other industrialised regions'. In Quebec, a lowered rate of giving birth has been mostly observed in people in their 20s. From 30 years of age and onwards, the rate is either increasing or stable. This demonstrates a trend towards wanting to form a family later in life. As of 2020, the average lifespan is 82.3 years. Between 2010 and 2019, there were between 1000 and 1600 deaths every week, with deaths being at their highest levels in January and their lowest levels in July. In 2021, the region's life expectancy increased after a decline amid the pandemic, reaching 83 years.

=== Percentage surviving ===
The percentage surviving, is the percent of the population that would survive to certain age, if their life conditions in a given year, were extrapolated to their whole life. Data for 2019.

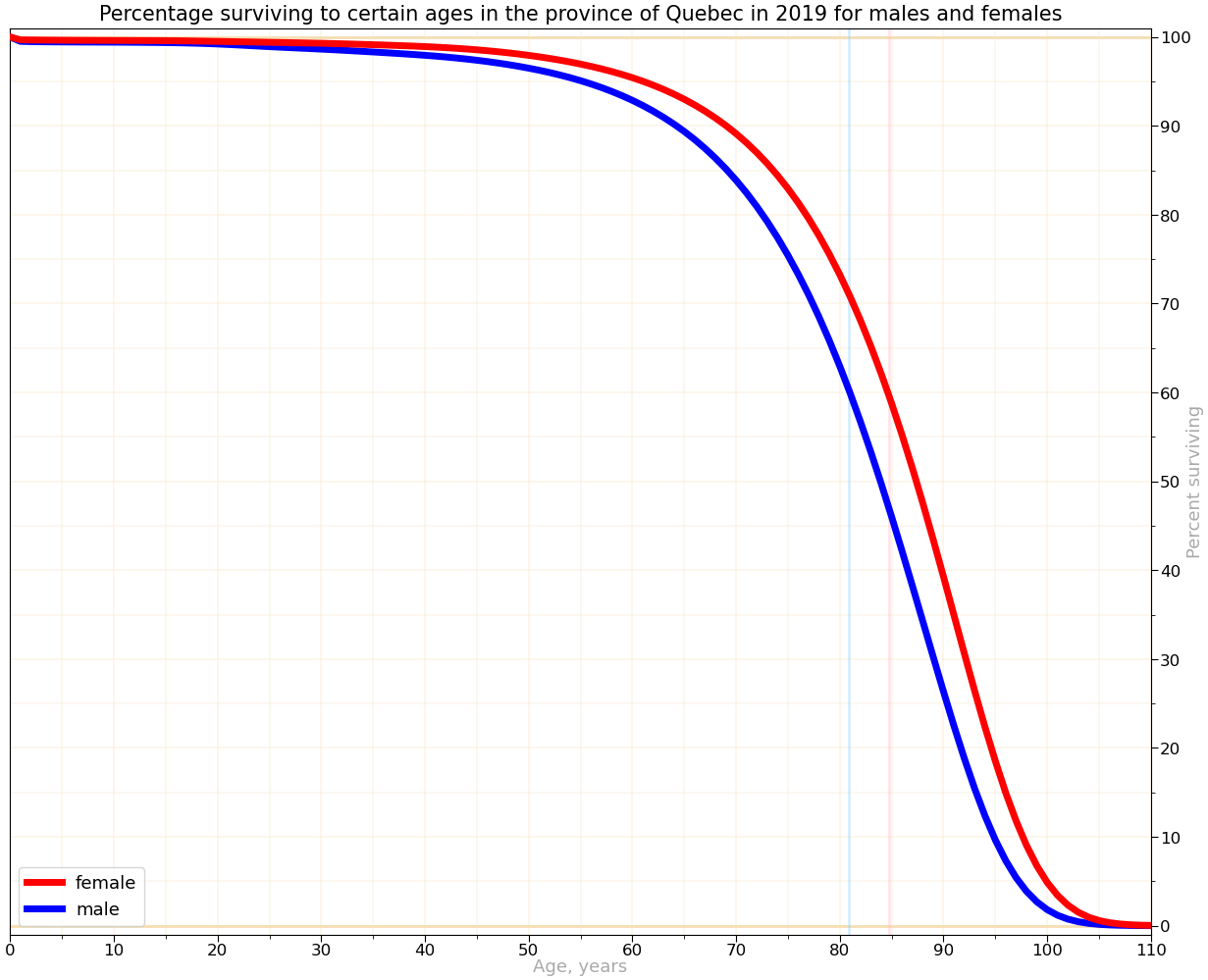
Percentage surviving to certain ages in Quebec in 2019. Life expectancy in the province in that year was 82.84 years.

Age	Percentage surviving		F / M
Age	male	female	F / M
1	99.5	99.7	1.00
5	99.4	99.6	1.00
10	99.4	99.6	1.00
15	99.4	99.6	1.00
20	99.2	99.5	1.00
25	98.9	99.4	1.00
30	98.6	99.3	1.01
35	98.3	99.1	1.01
40	97.9	98.9	1.01
45	97.4	98.6	1.01
50	96.5	97.9	1.01
55	95.1	97.0	1.02
60	92.9	95.4	1.03
65	89.4	93.0	1.04
70	83.9	89.1	1.06
75	75.4	82.9	1.10
80	63.0	73.3	1.16
85	46.0	58.8	1.28
90	26.3	39.3	1.49
95	9.6	18.5	1.92
100	1.802	4.874	2.70
105	0.144	0.577	4.01
110	0.005	0.027	5.40

Data source: Statistics Canada

== Population history ==
View chart definition.

Year	Population	Five-year % change	Ten-year % change	% Canada
1822	427,465	n/a	n/a	n/a
1831	553,134	n/a	29.4	n/a
1841	650,000	n/a	17.5	60.07^{[a]}
1851	892,061	n/a	37.0	48.32^{[a]}
1861	1,111,566	n/a	24.9	44.42^{[a]}
1871	1,191,516	n/a	7.9	32.3
1881	1,359,027	n/a	14.1	31.4
1891	1,488,535	n/a	9.5	30.8
1901	1,648,898	n/a	10.8	30.7
1911	2,005,776	n/a	21.6	27.8
1921	2,360,665	n/a	17.8	26.9
1931	2,874,255	n/a	21.8	27.7
1941	3,331,882	n/a	15.9	29.0
1951	4,055,681	n/a	21.8	28.9
1956	4,628,378	14.1	n/a	28.8
1961	5,259,211	13.6	29.7	28.8
1966	5,780,845	9.9	24.9	28.8
1971	6,027,765	4.3	14.6	27.9
1976	6,234,445	3.4	7.8	27.1
1981	6,438,403	3.3	6.8	26.4
1986	6,532,460	1.5	4.8	25.8
1991	6,895,963	5.6	7.1	25.2
1996	7,138,795	3.5	9.3	24.5
2001	7,237,479	1.4	5.0	23.8
2006	7,546,131	4.3	5.7	23.4
2011	7,903,001	4.7	9.2	23.1
2012	8,085,900	n/a	n/a	23.3
2013	8,155,500	n/a	n/a	23.2
2014	8,214,500	n/a	n/a	23.1
2015	8,259,500	n/a	n/a	23.0
2016	8,326,100	5.3	16.6	23.0
2017	8,398,200	3.8	n/a	22.0

Source: Statistics Canada ^{a} % Province of Canada population

== Ethnic origin ==
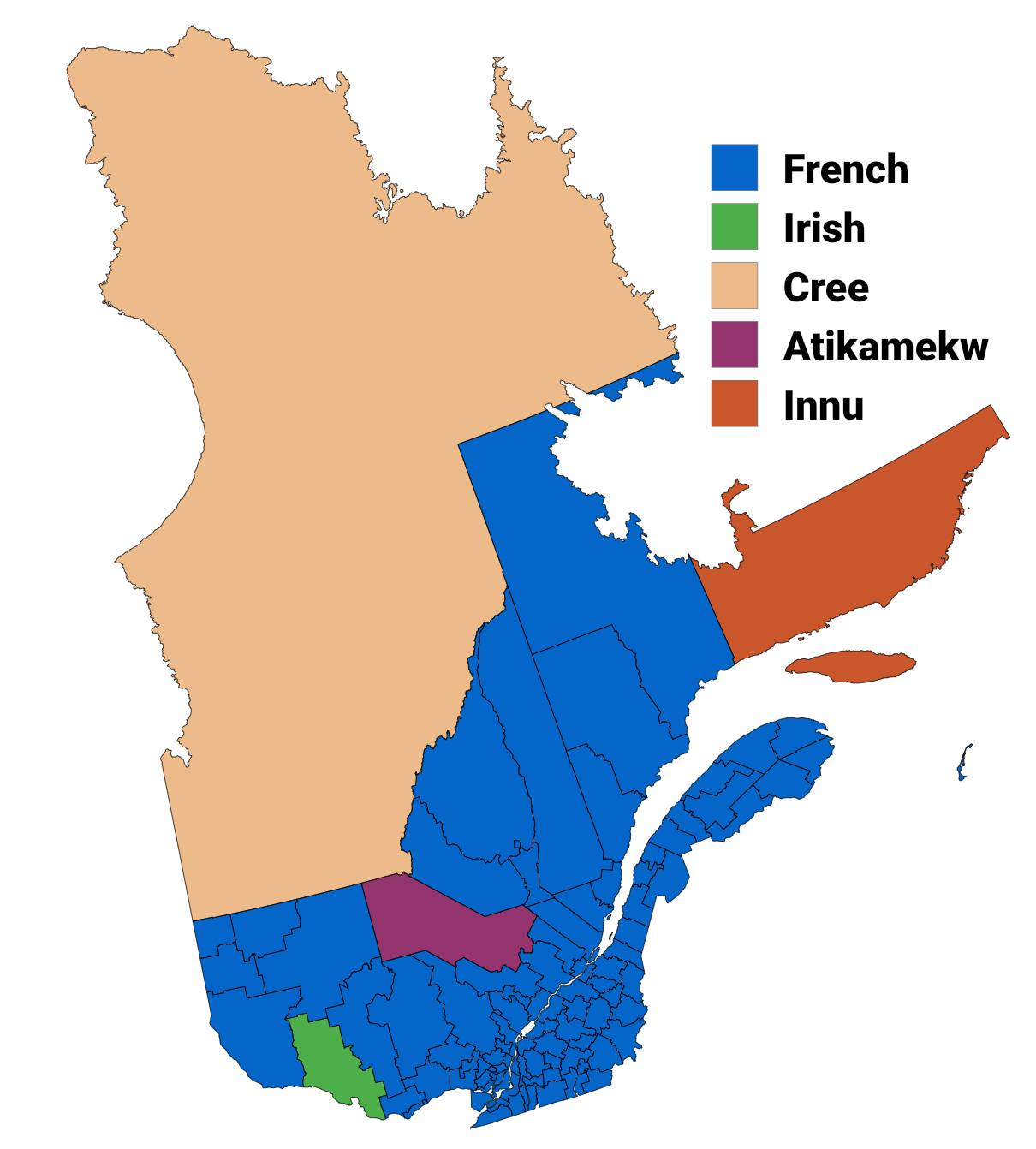
Largest ethnic origin in Quebec by census division besides Canadian, 2021 census

Ethnic origin	Population	Percent
Canadien/Canadian	4,474,115	60.1%
French	2,151,655	28.8%
Irish	406,085	5.5%
Italian	299,655	4.0%
English	245,155	3.3%
First Nations	219,815	3.0%
Scottish	202,515	2.7%
Québécois	140,075	1.9%
German	131,795	1.8%
Chinese	91,900	1.24%
Haitian	91,435	1.23%
Spanish	72,090	0.97%
Jewish	71,380	0.96%
Greek	65,985	0.89%
Polish	62,800	0.84%
Lebanese	60,950	0.83%
Portuguese	57,445	0.77%
Belgian	43,275	0.58%
East Indian	41,600	0.56%
Romanian	40,320	0.54%
Russian	40,155	0.54%
Moroccan	36,700	0.49%
American (USA)	36,695	0.49%
Métis	36,280	0.49%
Vietnamese	33,815	0.45%
Acadian	32,950	0.44%
Ukrainian	31,955	0.43%
African (Black)	30,170	0.41%
Filipino	25,680	0.35%
Algerian	25,150	0.34%
British Isles	23,445	0.32%
Armenian	23,230	0.31%
Dutch	23,015	0.31%
Hungarian	22,585	0.30%
Swiss	20,280	0.27%
Egyptian	17,950	0.24%
Salvadoran	15,770	0.21%
Syrian	14,925	0.20%

Ethnic origin	Population	Percent
Colombian	14,845	0.20%
Mexican	14,215	0.19%
Berbers	13,415	0.18%
Inuit	12,915	0.17%
Iranian	12,370	0.17%
Peruvian	12,335	0.17%
Jamaican	11,935	0.16%
Pakistani	11,710	0.16%
Chilean	11,585	0.16%
Turk	11,385	0.15%
Austrian	11,295	0.15%
Sri Lankan	10,750	0.14%
Congolese	10,190	0.14%
Cambodian	10,175	0.14%
Welsh	9,815	0.13%
Black	9,520	0.13%
Tunisian	7,870	0.11%
Bulgarian	6,955	0.09%
Guatemalan	6,880	0.09%
Laotian	6,425	0.09%
Norwegian	6,350	0.09%
Bangladeshi	6,095	0.08%
Yugoslav	6,090	0.08%
Swedish	5,975	0.08%
Afghan	5,855	0.08%
Lithuanians	5,665	0.08%
Korean	5,555	0.07%
Czech	5,540	0.07%
West Indian	5,420	0.07%
Barbadian	5,340	0.07%
Croatian	5,330	0.07%
Latin/Central/South American	5,270	0.07%
European	5,130	0.07%
Danish	5,130	0.07%
Palestinian	4,940	0.07%
Trinidadian/Tobagonian	4,810	0.06%
Japanese	4,560	0.06%
Slovak	4,560	0.06%

Percentages are calculated as a proportion of the total number of respondents (7,435,905) and may total more than 100 percent due to dual responses.
Only groups with 0.06 percent or more of respondents are shown.

Ethnicity according to the older more general system of classification is shown below:

Origins	2001	%
North American	4,989,230	70.02%
French	2,123,185	29.80%
British Isles	547,790	7.69%
Southern European	409,095	5.74%
Aboriginal	159,900	2.24%
Western European	153,750	2.16%
Arab	135,750	1.91%
East and Southeast Asian	132,280	1.86%

Origins	2001	%
Eastern European	130,410	1.83%
Caribbean	108,475	1.52%
Other European	86,450	1.21%
Latin, Central and South American	65,150	0.91%
South Asian	62,585	0.88%
African	48,715	0.68%
West Asian	40,960	0.57%
Northern European	15,295	0.21%

Percentages are calculated as a proportion of the total number of respondents (7,125,580) and may total more than 100% due to dual responses
Only groups of more than 0.02% are shown

=== Future projections ===
Panethnic origin projections in Quebec (2031–2041)
Panethnic group	2031		2036		2041	
Panethnic group	Pop.	%	Pop.	%	Pop.	%
European (Note: Statistic includes all persons that did not make up part of a visible minority or an Indigenous identity.)	6,913,000	75.63%	6,805,000	72.79%	6,677,000	69.95%
African	620,000	6.78%	722,000	7.72%	829,000	8.69%
Middle Eastern (Note: Statistic includes total responses of "West Asian" and "Arab" under visible minority section on census.)	498,000	5.45%	588,000	6.29%	683,000	7.16%
Indigenous	283,000	3.1%	305,000	3.26%	325,000	3.4%
East Asian (Note: Statistic includes total responses of "Chinese", "Korean", and "Japanese" under visible minority section on census.)	225,000	2.46%	255,000	2.73%	284,000	2.98%
Latin American	212,000	2.32%	238,000	2.55%	265,000	2.78%
South Asian	169,000	1.85%	189,000	2.02%	207,000	2.17%
Southeast Asian (Note: Statistic includes total responses of "Filipino" and "Southeast Asian" under visible minority section on census.)	155,000	1.7%	170,000	1.82%	185,000	1.94%
Other/multiracial (Note: Statistic includes total responses of "Visible minority, n.i.e." and "Multiple visible minorities" under visible minority section on census.)	66,000	0.72%	77,000	0.82%	90,000	0.94%
Projected Quebec population	9,141,000	100%	9,349,000	100%	9,545,000	100%

== Visible minorities and Indigenous peoples ==
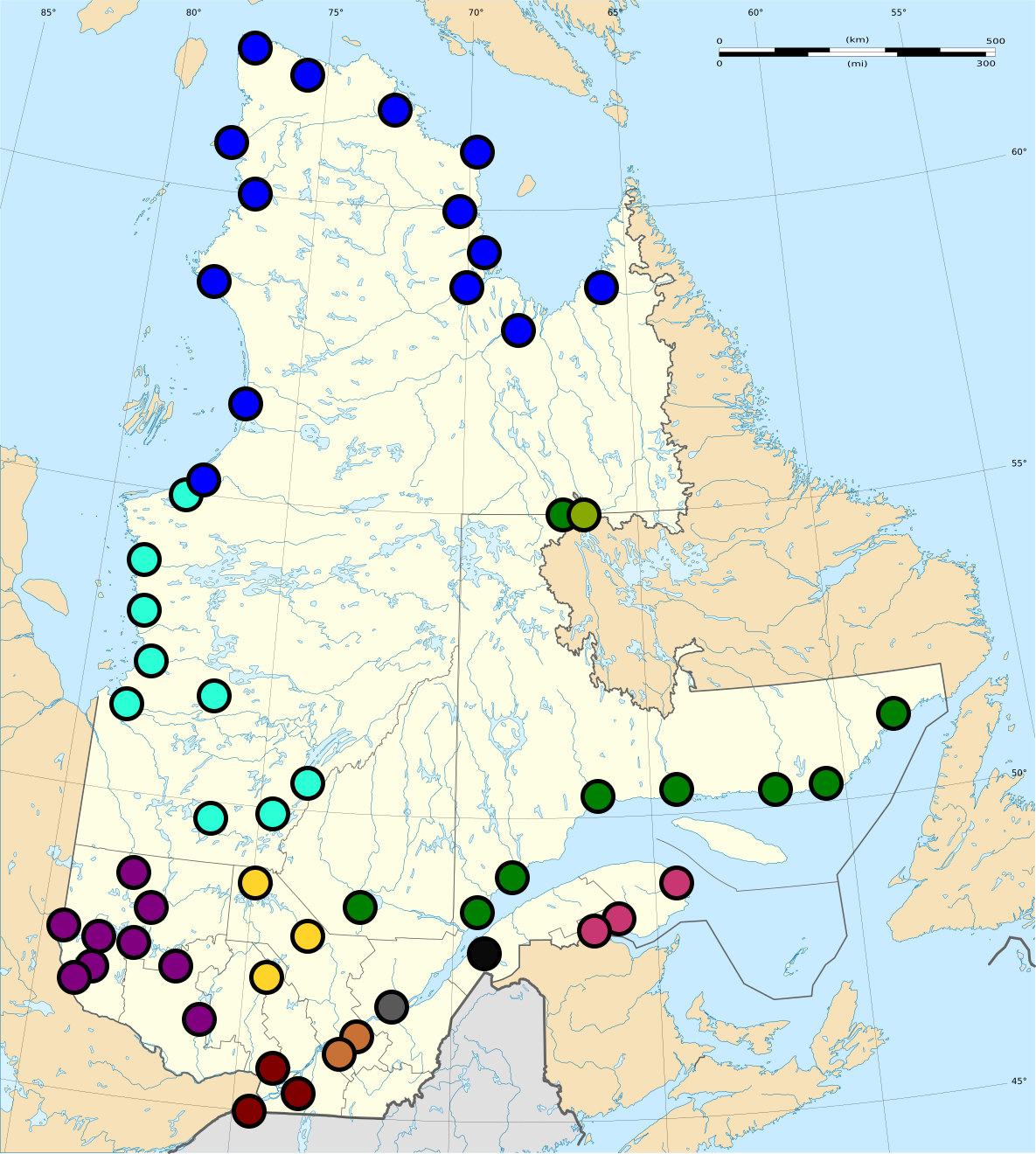
Map of indigenous communities in Quebec, this includes reserves, settlements and northern villages. Algonquin Atikamekw Abenaki Cree Wendat Innu Wolastoqiyik Mi'kmaq Mohawk Naskapi Inuit

The 2021 census counted a total Indigenous population of 205,010 (2.5%) including 116,550 First Nations (1.4%), 61,010 Métis (0.7%), and 15,800 Inuit (0.2%). The Indigenous population tends to be undercounted, as some Indian bands regularly refuse to participate in Canadian censuses for political reasons regarding the question of Indigenous sovereignty. In 2016, the Mohawk reserves of Kahnawake and Doncaster 17 along with the Indian settlement of Kanesatake and Lac-Rapide, a reserve of the Algonquins of Barriere Lake, were not counted.{Percentages are calculated as a proportion of the total number of respondents (7,435,905)}

The indigenous peoples of Quebec have inhabited the region for millennia. Each community possesses its own social structure, culture and territorial entity. In 2016, the indigenous population of Quebec numbered 182,885 people. However, since federal law only recognized children of indigenous fathers until the 1980s, the actual number may be higher.

Ethnicities living primarily south of the 55th parallel are collectively referred to in Quebec as "Amerindians", "Indians", "First Nations" or "Redskins" (bsolete.) Qbece 'stn First Nations ethnic groups are linked to two linguistic groups. The Algonquian family is made up of eight ethnic groups: the Abenaki, the Algonquin, the Atikamekw, the Cree, the Wolastoqiyik, the Mi'kmaq, the Innu and the Naskapi. These last two formed, until 1978, a single ethnic group: the Innu. The Iroquoian family is made up of the Wendat and the Mohawks. Only the Mohawks were part of the Iroquois Confederacy (Haudenosaunee), along with five other Indigenous groups from New York State and Ontario. The eleventh indigenous ethnic group in Quebec, the Inuit or Eskimos (obsolete), belong to the Inuit–Aleut family. The Inuit live mainly in Nunavik, Nord-du-Québec (Nouveau Quebec). The Inuit live mainly in Nunavik in Nord-du-Québec. They make up the majority of the population living north of the 55th parallel.

Of these indigenous peoples, so-called "nomadic" tribes exist, specifically the tribes of Algonquian cultures (e.g.: the Algonquins, the Cree and the Innu), as well as more "sedentary" ones, specifically the tribes of Iroquoian traditions (e.g.: the Iroquois and the Wendat). The more sedentary groups developed more complex social organization. Traditionally, nomadic tribes follow animal migrations, such as bison, moose or seals. The Algonquian and Inuit ways of life are dictated by the obligations of hunting and fishing. The traditions of the Iroquoian tribes, producers of the "Three Sisters" (corn, beans and squash), are developed around a matriarchal structure derived from the longhouse which houses several families under the authority of one dean.

Approximately 16% of the population of Quebec belongs to a visible minority group, as of the 2021 Canadian census. This is a lower percentage than that of British Columbia, Ontario, Alberta, and Manitoba but higher than that of the remaining five provinces. Most visible minorities in Quebec live in or near Montreal.

Visible minority and Indigenous population (2011 Canadian census, 2016 Canadian census, & 2021 Canadian census)
Population group		Population (2021)	% (2021)	Population (2016)	% (2016)	Population (2011)	% (2011)
European		6,762,735	81.4%	6,750,200	84.7%	6,740,370	87.2%
Visible minority group Source:	Black	422,405	5.1%	319,230	4%	243,625	3.2%
Visible minority group Source:	Arab	280,075	3.4%	213,740	2.7%	166,260	2.2%
Visible minority group Source:	Latin American	172,925	2.1%	133,920	1.7%	116,380	1.5%
Visible minority group Source:	South Asian	127,990	1.5%	90,335	1.1%	83,320	1.1%
Visible minority group Source:	Chinese	115,240	1.4%	99,505	1.2%	82,845	1.1%
Visible minority group Source:	Southeast Asian	70,455	0.8%	62,820	0.8%	65,855	0.9%
Visible minority group Source:	Filipino	44,885	0.5%	34,910	0.4%	31,495	0.4%
Visible minority group Source:	West Asian	43,985	0.5%	32,405	0.4%	23,445	0.3%
Visible minority group Source:	Multiple visible minority	34,960	0.4%	23,045	0.3%	17,420	0.2%
Visible minority group Source:	Visible minority, n.i.e.	12,150	0.1%	9,840	0.1%	8,895	0.1%
Visible minority group Source:	Korean	10,360	0.1%	8,055	0.1%	6,665	0.1%
Visible minority group Source:	Japanese	5,305	0.1%	4,570	0.1%	4,025	0.1%
Total visible minority population		1,340,735	16.1%	1,032,365	13%	850,235	11%
Indigenous group Source:	First Nations (North American Indian)	116,550	1.4%	92,655	1.2%	82,425	1.1%
Indigenous group Source:	Métis	61,010	0.7%	69,365	0.9%	40,960	0.5%
Indigenous group Source:	Inuk (Inuit)	15,800	0.2%	13,940	0.2%	12,570	0.2%
Indigenous group Source:	Indigenous responses n.i.e.	8,515	0.1%	4,170	0.1%	4,415	0.1%
Indigenous group Source:	Multiple Indigenous responses	3,135	0%	2,760	0%	1,545	0%
Total Indigenous population		205,010	2.5%	182,885	2.3%	141,915	1.8%
Total number of responses		8,308,480	100%	7,965,450	100%	7,732,520	100%
Total population		8,501,833	100%	8,164,361	100%	7,732,520	100%

=== Relations with Québécois ===
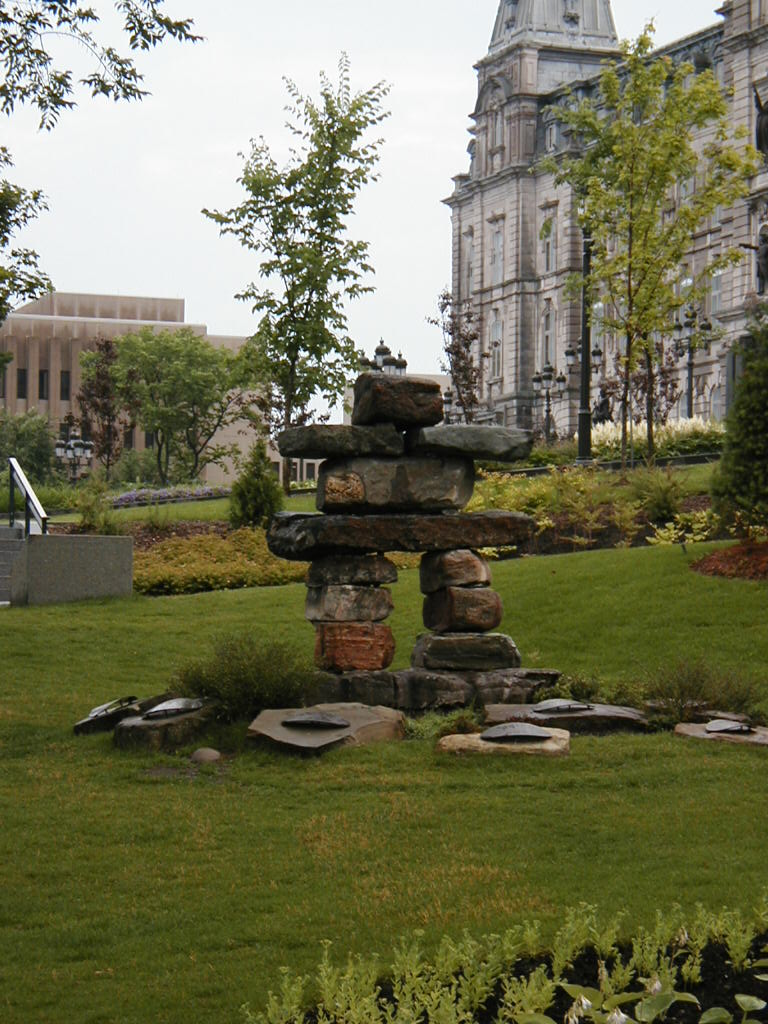
An Inuit inuksuk at the Place de l'Assemblée-Nationale in front of the Parliament of Quebec.

Although they represent today approximately 3% of the Quebec population, the indigenous peoples of Quebec have contributed a lot to Quebec society thanks to their ideals of respect for flora, fauna, nature and the environment as well as thanks to their values of hospitality, generosity and sharing. Economically, through the fur trade and the development of relationships with settlers, including coureurs des bois, merchants, cartographers and Jesuit fathers. In addition to contributing to Quebec toponymy, indigenous peoples also contributed through their more advanced knowledge than settlers in the following areas: holistic medicine, the functioning of human biology, remedies for several diseases, curing scurvy at settlers' arrival (its thought this was done with a cure made from fir, white cedar or anneda), winter clothing (tanning), architecture that insulates against the cold, means of faster transport on snow (snowshoes and dogsled) and on water (canoes, kayaks and rabaskas), l'acériculture (the process of making maple syrup), sports (lacrosse and ice fishing), moose and caribou hunting, trapping, the territory and its components, watersheds and their watercourses and natural resources.

When Europeans arrived in America in the 16th century, the Algonquian-speaking peoples and the St. Lawrence Iroquoians made allies with the French colonists for the purpose of trade. The first connection was made with the arrival of Jacques Cartier when he set foot in Gaspé and met Donnacona, chief of the village of Stadacona (Stadaconé, today, the city of Quebec), in 1534. Moreover, the legend of the Kingdom of Saguenay prompted King Francis I to finance new trips to the New World.

Rather than by conquest and by force, it is by promoting commercial and military alliances, and by concluding numerous peace and friendship treaties that relations between the two peoples solidified.

Aboriginal rights were enunciated in the Indian Act and adopted at the end of the 19th century. This act confines First Nations within reserves created for them. The Indian Act remains in effect. In 1975, the Cree, Inuit and the Quebec government formalized to the James Bay and Northern Quebec Agreement that would extend indigenous rights beyond reserves, to over two-thirds of Quebec's territory. Because this extension was enacted without the participation of the national government, it covers only Quebec. In 1978, the Naskapis joined the agreement when the Northeastern Quebec Agreement was signed.

First Nations political institutions include:

- The Assembly of First Nations Quebec-Labrador
- The Grand Council of the Crees
- The Makivik Corporation

=== Rights of indigenous people ===
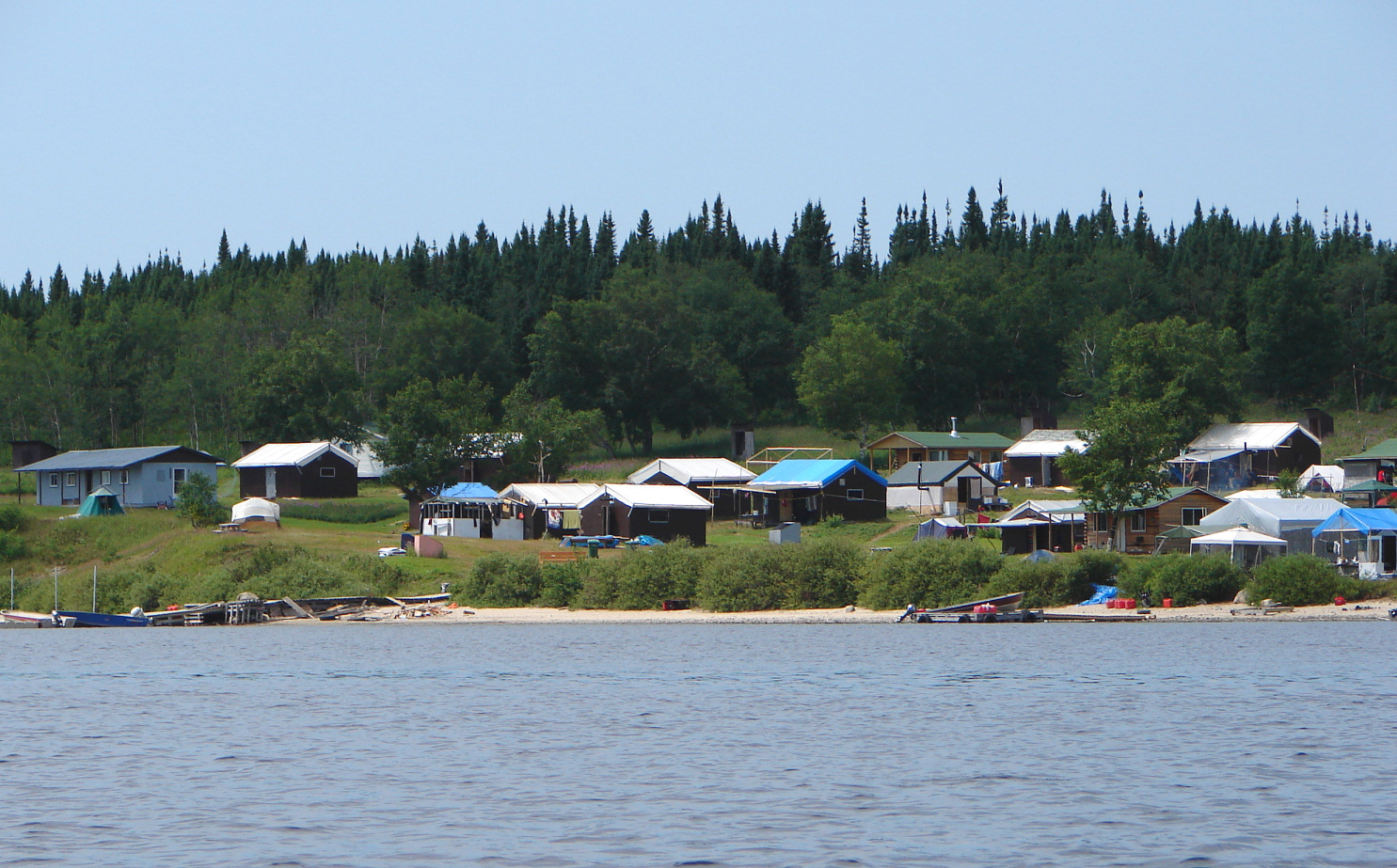
Nemiscau: the village in Nord-du-Québec home to the Grand Council of the Crees.

In the Royal Proclamation of 1763, issued by King George III, the indigenous peoples were stated to have an indisputable right to their lands. However, quickly following the proclamation and after the peace treaties with New France and France concluded, the British Crown decided to institute territorial treaties which allowed British authorities to proceed with the total extinction of the land titles of the Indigenous groups.

Entirely under federal tutelage and direction, indigenous rights were enunciated in the Indian Act and adopted at the end of the 19th century. This act confines First Nations within the Indian reserves created for them. The Indian Act is still in effect today.

In 1975, the Cree, Inuit and the Quebec government agreed to an agreement called the James Bay and Northern Quebec Agreement that would extended Indigenous rights beyond Indian reserves, and to over two-thirds of Quebec's territory. Because this extension was enacted without the participation of the federal government, the extended Indigenous rights only exist in Quebec. In 1978, the Naskapis joined the agreement when the Northeastern Quebec Agreement was signed. As a result, these three ethnic groups were able to break away from their subjugation to the Indian Act.

In recent times, discussions have been underway for several years with the Innu of the Côte-Nord and Saguenay–Lac-Saint-Jean for the potential creation of a similar autonomy in two new distinct territories that would be called Innu Assi and Nitassinan. Moreover, in January 2010, an agreement between Quebec City and the Innu granted the Mashteuiatsh Band Council the ability to plan out development in the entire Ashuapmushuan Wildlife Reserve, which is located on the Nitassinan of the community of the Pekuakamiulnuatsh.

A few political institutions have also been created over time:

- The Assembly of First Nations Quebec-Labrador
- The Grand Council of the Crees
- The Makivik Corporation

=== Indigenous lands ===
The following table shows the traditional territories of the First Nations and Inuit peoples who live in Quebec, including the basins of the St. Lawrence Valley and James Bay, as well as on the Labrador peninsula.

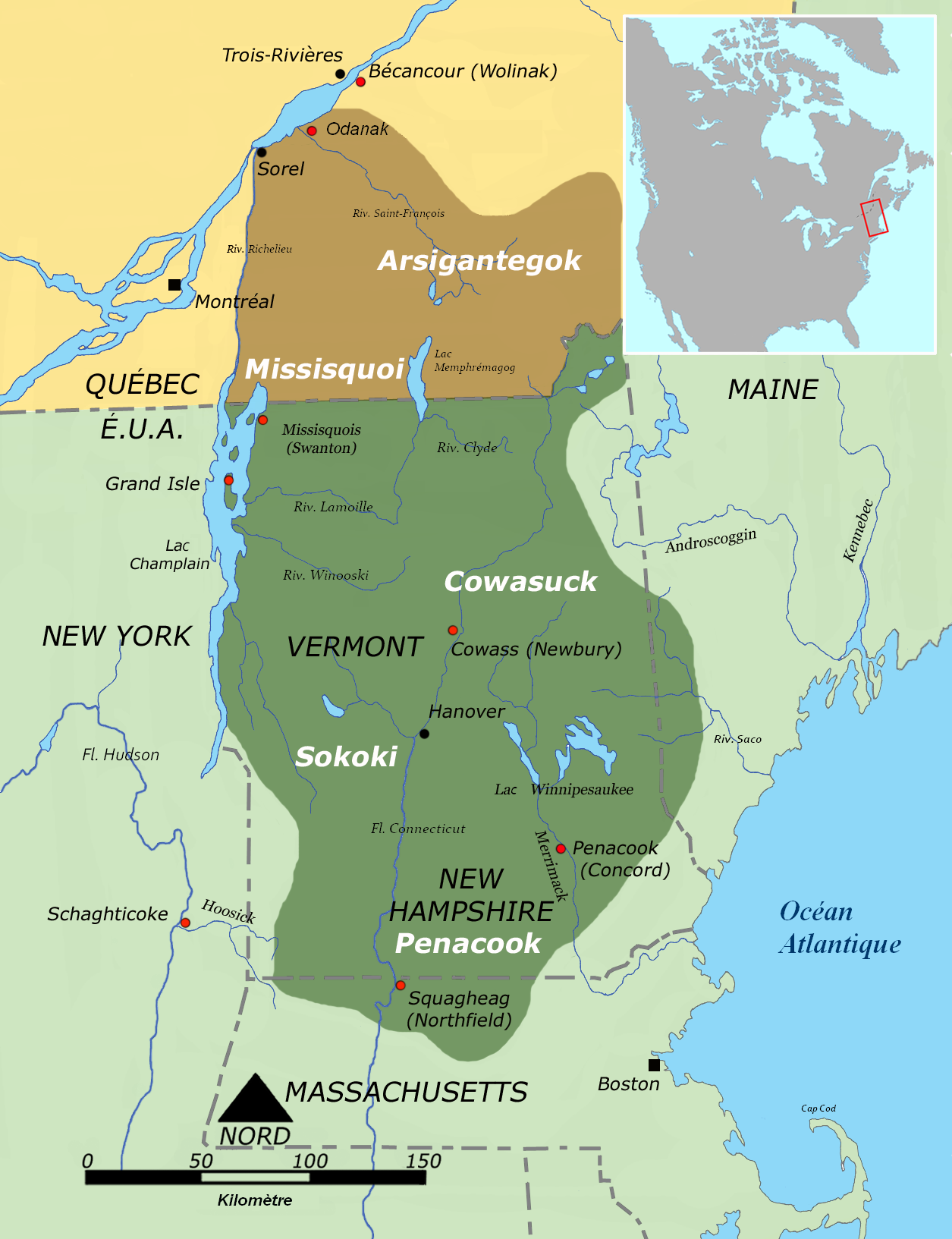
Map of the traditional territory and co-territorial area of the Abenakis, which overlaps between Quebec and Massachusetts.

Traditional territories of the different Indigenous peoples of Quebec
Groups	Sub-groups	Name of territory	Territorial division	Other names for territory
Ojibwe		Anishinaabewaki	Osogonek	Anishinaabe Ahiki
	Algonquins	Osogonek		
Attikameks		Kitaskino		Nehirowisi Aski / Nitaskinan
Iroquois confederation		Haudenosauneega	Kanienkeh	Aquanishuonigy
	Mohawks	Kanienkeh		
Wabanaki confederation		Wabanaki	***	
	Abenaki	Ndakinna		N'dakina
	Wolastoqiyik	Wolastokuk		
	Mi'kmaq	Mi'kma'ki		Migmagi
Cree		Eeyou Istchee		
Wendat		Wendake		
Innu (Montagnais)		Nitassinan	Innu Assi	
Inuit		Inuit Nunangat	Nunavik	
	Nunavimmiutitut	Nunavik		
Naskapis		Nutshimiu-Aschiiy		Nuchimiiyu - chhiiy

== Acadians ==
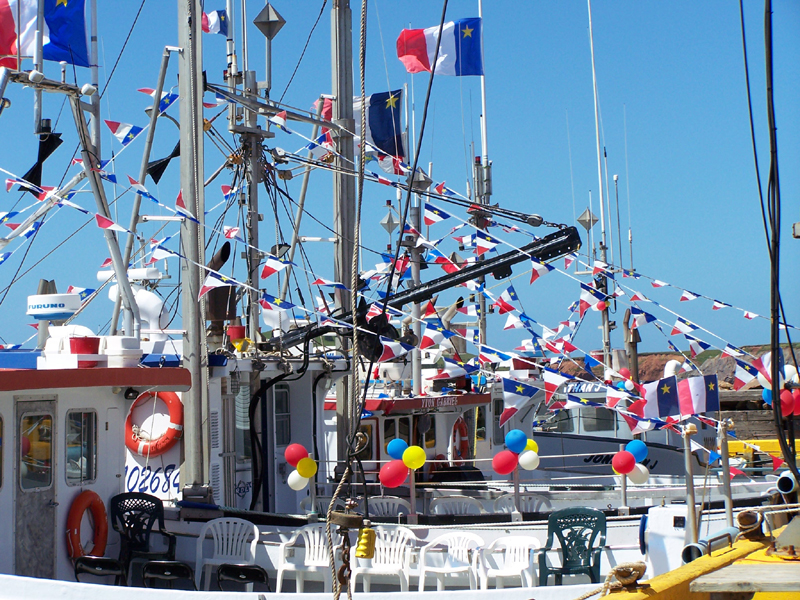
Boats docked in the Magdalen Islands are sometimes decorated with Acadian flags.

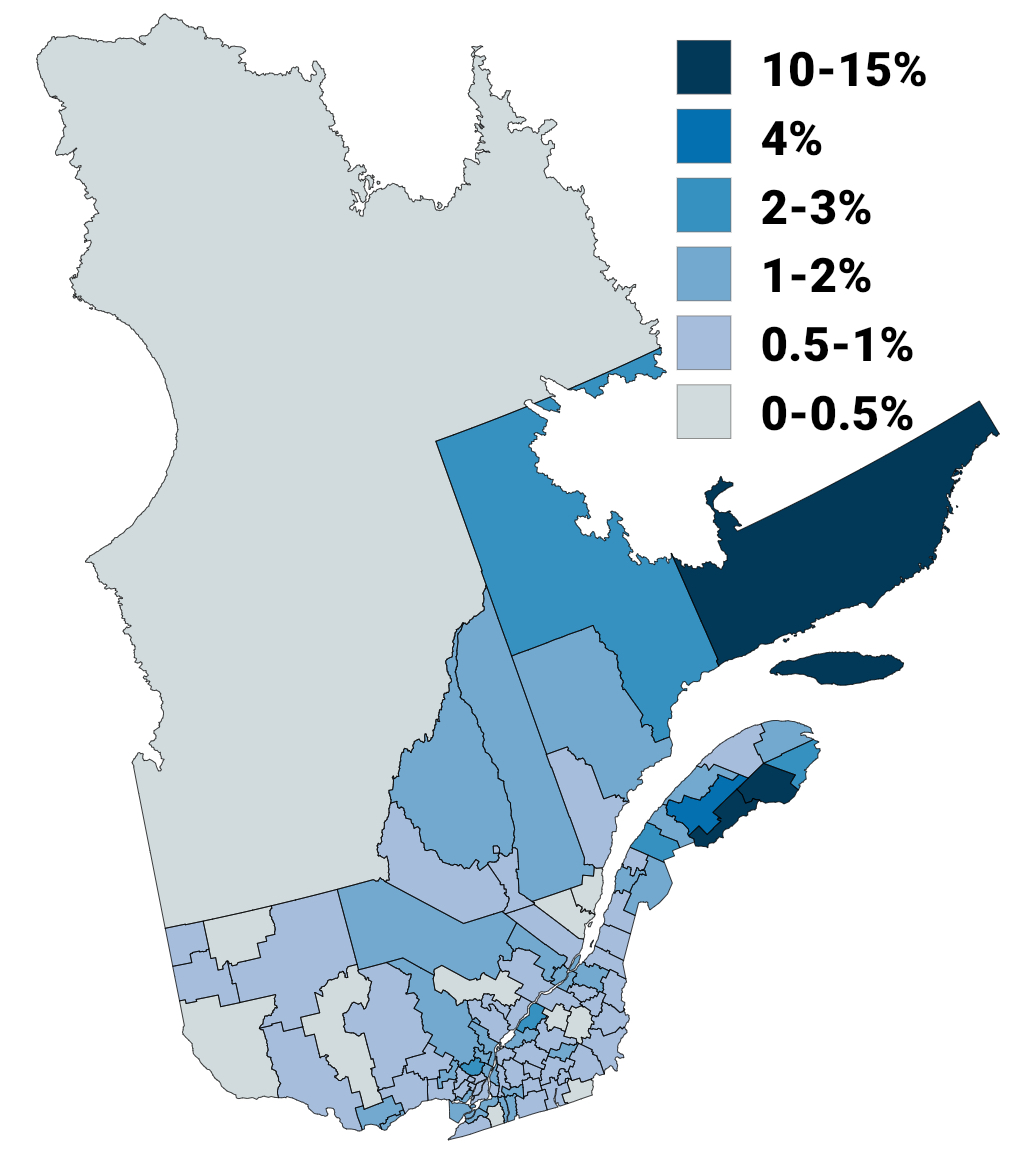
Percentage of Acadians in Quebec by census division, 2021 census

More than a million people in Quebec are of Acadian ascent, with roughly 4.8 million having Acadian ancestors. Furthermore, more than a million people bear a patronym of Acadian origin. All of this is because a large number of Acadians took refuge in Quebec during the Great Upheaval.

Quebec's Acadian community spreads across several regions, mainly on the Magdalen Islands and in Gaspesia, with another thirty communities elsewhere in Quebec, mostly in the Côte-Nord and Centre-du-Québec regions. An Acadian community in Quebec can be called a "Cadie" or "Petite Cadie", while some places use the demonym "Cadien".

The Festival Acadien des Îles-de-la-Madeleine is an annual festival in memory of the founders of the first villages on the Magdalen Islands. The festival is held in Havre Aubert for about two weeks. Bonaventure houses the Musé Acadien du Québec which features permanent exhibits, like Une Acadie québécoise and Secrets d'Acadiens, les coulisses de la rue Grand-Pré. In 2002, on National Acadian Day, the Commission de la capitale nationale du Québec unveiled a monument to Acadians entitled "Towards the Light". The monument symbolizes and explains the predominant role that the Acadians and their descendants played in the history of Quebec. The Premier of Quebec, Bernard Landry, declared at this unveiling that:

Between the Québécois people and the Acadian people, there is more than friendship, there is kinship.

== Languages ==
Quebec differs from other Canadian provinces in that French is its sole official language, while English predominates in the rest of Canada. French is the common language, understood and spoken by 93.7% of the population according to the 2021 census, and is the sole native language of 74.8% of the population (or slightly more than 6.5 million residents) and a native language (alone or in combination with others) of 77.8%. This makes Quebec the only Canadian province whose population is mainly Francophone. Quebec French is the umbrella term for local variants of the language. Canada is estimated to be home to roughly 30 regional French accents, 17 in Quebec. 42.2% of Quebec's population with a French mother tongue can converse in English, the predominant language of the rest of Canada.

The Office québécois de la langue française oversees the application of linguistic policies respecting French on the territory, jointly with the Superior Council of the French Language and the Commission de toponymie du Québec. The foundation for these linguistic policies was created in 1968 by the Gendron Commission and they have been accompanied the Charter of the French language ("Bill 101") since 1977. The policies intend to protect Quebec from assimilation by its English-speaking neighbours (the rest of Canada and the United States) and to rectify historical injustice between the Francophone majority and Anglophone minority, the latter of which were favoured since Quebec was a colony of the British Empire. Quebec and Haiti are the only major Francophone-dominant regions in the Americas.

Anglo-Quebecers, a name for residents whose main language is English, constitute the second largest linguistic group in Quebec. In 2021, English was the sole mother tongue of 7.6% of Quebec residents, and was a native language (alone or in combination with others) of 10.0%. Anglo-Quebecers reside mainly in the west of the island of Montreal (West Island), downtown Montreal and the Pontiac.

Three families of Indigenous languages encompassing eleven languages are spoken in Quebec: the Algonquian language family (Abenaki, Algonquin, Maliseet-passamaquoddy, Mi'kmaq, and the linguistic continuum of Atikamekw, Cree, Innu-aimun, and Naskapi), the Inuit–Aleut language family (Nunavimmiutitut, an Inuktitut dialect spoken by the Inuit of Nord-du-Québec), and the Iroquoian language family (Mohawk and Wendat). In the 2016 census, 50,895 people said they knew at least one Indigenous language and 45,570 people declared having an Indigenous language as their mother tongue. In Quebec, most Indigenous languages are transmitted quite well from one generation to the next with a mother tongue retention rate of 92%.

As of the 2016 census, the most common immigrant languages claimed as a native language were Arabic (2.5% of the total population), Spanish (1.9%), Italian (1.4%), Creole languages (mainly Haitian Creole) (0.8%), and Mandarin (0.6%).

As of the 2021 Canadian census, the ten most spoken languages in the province were French (spoken by 7,786,735 people, or 93.72% of the population), English (4,317,180 or 51.96%), Spanish (453,905 or 5.46%), Arabic (343,675 or 4.14%), Italian (168,040 or 2.02%), Haitian Creole (118,010 or 1.42%), Mandarin (80,520 or 0.97%), Portuguese (65,605 or 0.8%), Russian (55,485 or 0.7%), and Greek (50,375 or 0.6%). The question on knowledge of languages allows for multiple responses.

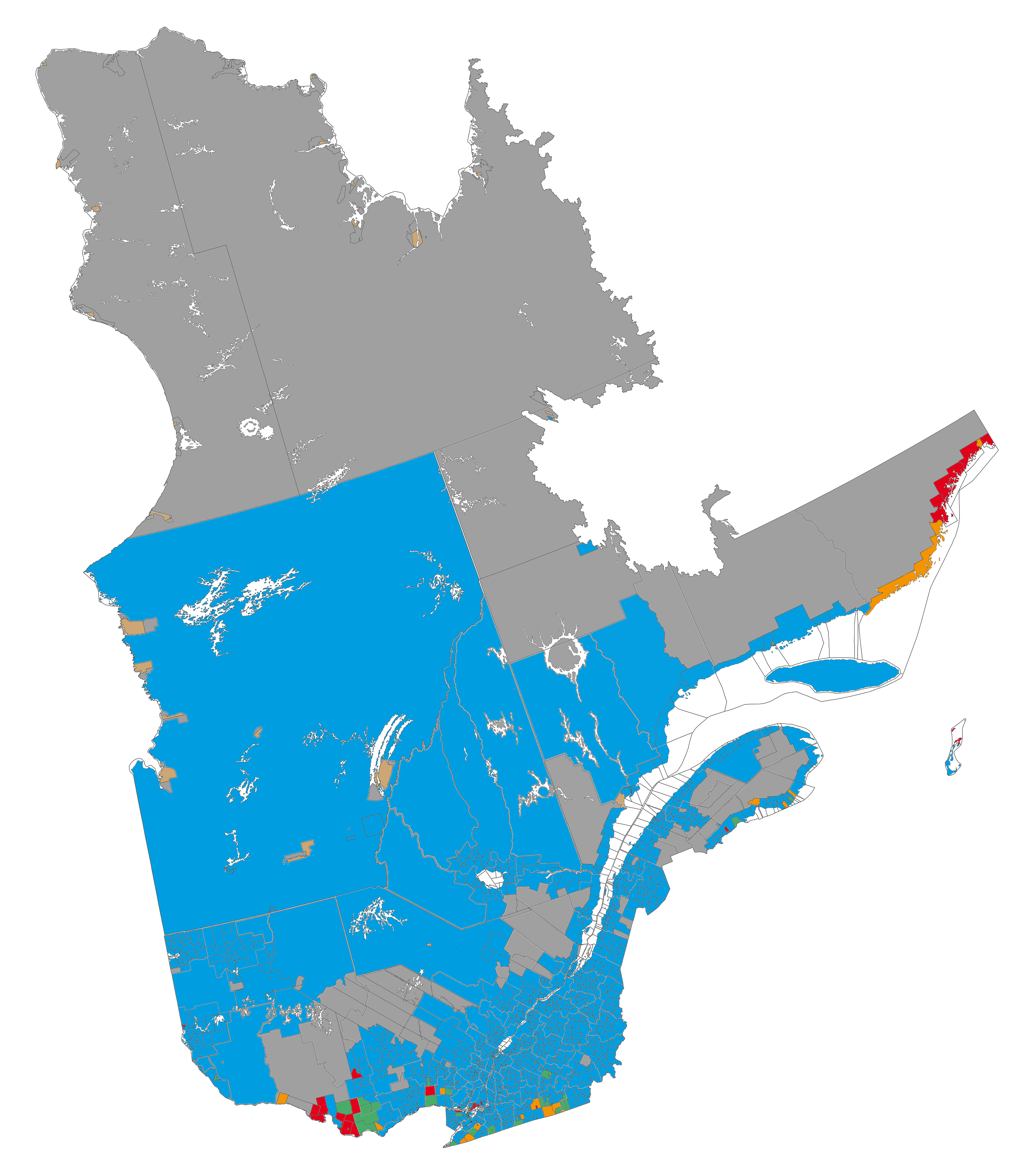
Linguistic map of the province of Quebec (source: Statistics Canada, 2006 census): Francophone majority, less than 33% Anglophone Francophone majority, more than 33% Anglophone Anglophone majority, less than 33% Francophone Anglophone majority, more than 33% Francophone Data not available

About 42.6% of the population (3,328,725 people are bilingual in French and English); this is the highest proportion in any Canadian province. The federal electoral district of Lac-Saint-Louis, located in the Bilingual Belt, is the most bilingual area in the province with 72.8%, according to the 2011 census. In contrast, in the rest of Canada, in 2006, only about 10.2 percent (2,430,990) of the population had a knowledge of both of the country's official languages.

The Quebec government defends the French language and the Francophonie in the face of the mostly English-dominated rest of North America. The Gendron Commission report of 1968 established the foundations for the white book of the government of Quebec' linguistic policy. Dependent on commissions of inquiry, this policy statement is also accompanied the Charter of the French language -or "Bill 101"- since 1977.

"The campaign of systematic disinformation waged by English-language newspapers about Quebec began with the Charter and has never ceased to draw on the Charter; it gave rise to stubborn prejudices and maintains a profound ignorance of the reality of Quebec."

=== Knowledge of languages ===
Knowledge of Languages in Quebec (1991–2021)
Language	2021 Canadian census		2016 Canadian census		2011 Canadian census		2006 Canadian census		2001 Canadian census		1996 Canadian census		1991 Canadian census	
Language	Pop.	%	Pop.	%	Pop.	%	Pop.	%	Pop.	%	Pop.	%	Pop.	%
French	7,786,740	93.72%	7,522,350	94.44%	7,375,900	94.37%	7,028,740	94.52%	6,739,050	94.58%	6,612,305	93.86%	6,371,920	93.56%
English	4,317,180	51.96%	3,930,690	49.35%	3,692,585	47.24%	3,354,650	45.11%	3,234,745	45.4%	3,019,100	42.85%	2,786,745	40.92%
Spanish	453,905	5.46%	390,355	4.9%	348,920	4.46%	291,010	3.91%	231,315	3.25%	190,990	2.71%	145,665	2.14%
Arabic	343,680	4.14%	267,965	3.36%	211,825	2.71%	157,025	2.11%	115,785	1.62%	91,770	1.3%	74,680	1.1%
Italian	168,040	2.02%	173,710	2.18%	177,890	2.28%	191,340	2.57%	188,925	2.65%	192,595	2.73%	190,430	2.8%
Creoles	135,275	1.63%	115,445	1.45%	99,045	1.27%	78,230	1.05%	62,910	0.88%	59,340	0.84%	42,780	0.63%
Chinese (Note: Including total responses to all Chinese languages and dialects.)	106,915	1.29%	90,060	1.13%	80,025	1.02%	73,550	0.99%	52,565	0.74%	46,390	0.66%	36,555	0.54%
Portuguese	65,605	0.79%	55,100	0.69%	47,640	0.61%	46,795	0.63%	45,450	0.64%	42,765	0.61%	42,565	0.63%
German (Note: Including total responses to all High German languages.)	57,855	0.7%	56,120	0.7%	58,785	0.75%	61,460	0.83%	66,745	0.94%	72,040	1.02%	76,725	1.13%
Russian	55,485	0.67%	46,665	0.59%	39,015	0.5%	29,925	0.4%	22,285	0.31%	17,595	0.25%	10,800	0.16%
Greek	50,370	0.61%	51,060	0.64%	53,020	0.68%	52,490	0.71%	52,050	0.73%	53,035	0.75%	54,575	0.8%
Persian (Note: Including total responses to all Persian Language dialects.)	44,745	0.54%	32,965	0.41%	22,825	0.29%	16,950	0.23%	13,160	0.18%	10,515	0.15%	8,020	0.12%
Romanian	44,515	0.54%	42,655	0.54%	33,690	0.43%	30,375	0.41%	15,155	0.21%	12,935	0.18%	8,615	0.13%
Vietnamese	37,650	0.45%	34,580	0.43%	37,370	0.48%	32,775	0.44%	28,755	0.4%	28,835	0.41%	24,115	0.35%
Algonquian (Note: Including total responses to all Algonquian languages: Cree–Innu, Mi'kmaq, Ojibway–Potawatomi, and others.)	35,985	0.43%	37,515	0.47%	34,555	0.44%	33,280	0.45%	29,265	0.41%	27,255	0.39%	22,245	0.33%
Hindi (Note: Note: Hindi and Urdu form mutually intelligible registers of the Hindustani language.)	35,770	0.43%	15,570	0.2%	13,180	0.17%	13,315	0.18%	11,255	0.16%	10,035	0.14%	6,800	0.1%
Punjabi	34,290	0.41%	17,860	0.22%	14,480	0.19%	15,435	0.21%	13,050	0.18%	9,155	0.13%	4,850	0.07%
Tagalog	33,810	0.41%	26,705	0.34%	25,320	0.32%	19,400	0.26%	15,140	0.21%	12,430	0.18%	8,585	0.13%
Armenian	22,095	0.27%	20,290	0.25%	18,645	0.24%	18,540	0.25%	16,960	0.24%	17,215	0.24%	16,840	0.25%
Urdu	21,175	0.25%	16,545	0.21%	14,295	0.18%	15,125	0.2%	10,845	0.15%	7,585	0.11%	5,060	0.07%
Tamil	20,050	0.24%	17,245	0.22%	19,460	0.25%	13,965	0.19%	13,180	0.18%	9,440	0.13%	5,315	0.08%
Hebrew	19,210	0.23%	18,035	0.23%	19,150	0.25%	18,835	0.25%	18,225	0.26%	19,510	0.28%	17,200	0.25%
Polish	16,790	0.2%	17,760	0.22%	18,365	0.23%	20,945	0.28%	22,330	0.31%	24,325	0.35%	25,755	0.38%
Inuit–Inuktut–Inuktitut	13,905	0.17%	12,595	0.16%	12,550	0.16%	10,415	0.14%	9,255	0.13%	8,525	0.12%	7,525	0.11%
Serbo-Croatian	11,145	0.13%	11,990	0.15%	10,415	0.13%	11,605	0.16%	9,595	0.13%	8,085	0.11%	2,950	0.04%
Gujarati	10,645	0.13%	7,950	0.1%	7,485	0.1%	7,155	0.1%	7,005	0.1%	5,455	0.08%	4,040	0.06%
Ukrainian	10,185	0.12%	9,015	0.11%	6,780	0.09%	7,900	0.11%	8,180	0.11%	9,360	0.13%	9,180	0.13%
Japanese	9,300	0.11%	7,040	0.09%	6,135	0.08%	4,625	0.06%	3,630	0.05%	3,610	0.05%	2,720	0.04%
Korean	9,265	0.11%	6,260	0.08%	5,365	0.07%	4,290	0.06%	3,285	0.05%	3,145	0.04%	2,420	0.04%
Hungarian	6,850	0.08%	7,215	0.09%	8,230	0.11%	9,730	0.13%	9,805	0.14%	11,460	0.16%	12,400	0.18%
Dutch	5,175	0.06%	5,060	0.06%	5,475	0.07%	5,555	0.07%	5,590	0.08%	5,750	0.08%	5,960	0.09%
Scandinavian (Note: Total responses to all Scandinavian–North Germanic languages, including Danish, Icelandic, Norwegian, and Swedish.)	3,340	0.04%	3,065	0.04%	3,120	0.04%	3,000	0.04%	3,200	0.04%	2,700	0.04%	2,920	0.04%
Total responses	8,308,480	97.7%	7,965,450	97.6%	7,815,955	98.9%	7,435,900	98.5%	7,125,580	98.5%	7,045,085	98.7%	6,810,300	98.8%
Total population	8,501,833	100%	8,164,361	100%	7,903,001	100%	7,546,131	100%	7,237,479	100%	7,138,795	100%	6,895,963	100%

=== Mother tongue language ===
Mother tongue language in Quebec (Statistics Canada: 2006, 2001, 1996)
Language(s)	2011		2006		2001		1996	
Language(s)	Population	Percentage (%)	Population	Percentage (%)	Population	Percentage (%)	Population	Percentage (%)
French	6,102,210	78	5,877,660	79	5,761,765	80.8	5,742,575	80.4
English	599,225	7.6	575,555	7.7	557,040	7.8	568,405	8.0
Both English and French	64,800	0.8	43,335	0.6	50,060	0.7	97,225	1.4
Total population	7,815,950	100	7,435,905	100	7,125,580	100	7,138,795	100

=== Language spoken at home ===
Language spoken most often at home in Quebec (Statistics Canada: 2006)
Language	Population	Percentage (%)
French	6,027,735	81.1
English	744,430	10.0
Both English and French	52,325	0.7
Non-official languages	518,320	7.0
Both French and a non-official language	54,490	0.7
Both English and a non-official language	26,560	0.4
French, English and a non-official language	12,035	0.2
Total population	7,435,905	100

=== French ===
French is the official language of Quebec. Québécois French is the most widely used variant. The Office québécois de la langue française oversees the application of the linguistic policy on the territory jointly with the Superior Council of the French Language and the Commission de toponymie du Québec. Their recommendations then become part of the debate on the standard for Quebec French and are represented in Le Grand Dictionnaire terminologique (GDT), the Banque de dépannage linguistique (BDL) and various other works. Through its linguistic recommendations, the GDT fights against the invasion of Frenglish into the French language. Since the 1970s, scientific research on the matter has been carried out by university organizations, including the Trésor de la langue française au Québec (TLFQ) and the Franqus group.

The French settlers who settled in New France came largely from the western and northern provinces of France. They generally spoke a variety of regional languages of the Oïl language family. Thus, creating the need for the colonists to "unify their patois" ("unite their dialects") and creating Quebec French. Québécois French became the vernacular language of New France, and it remained as such until the British's conquest of New France.

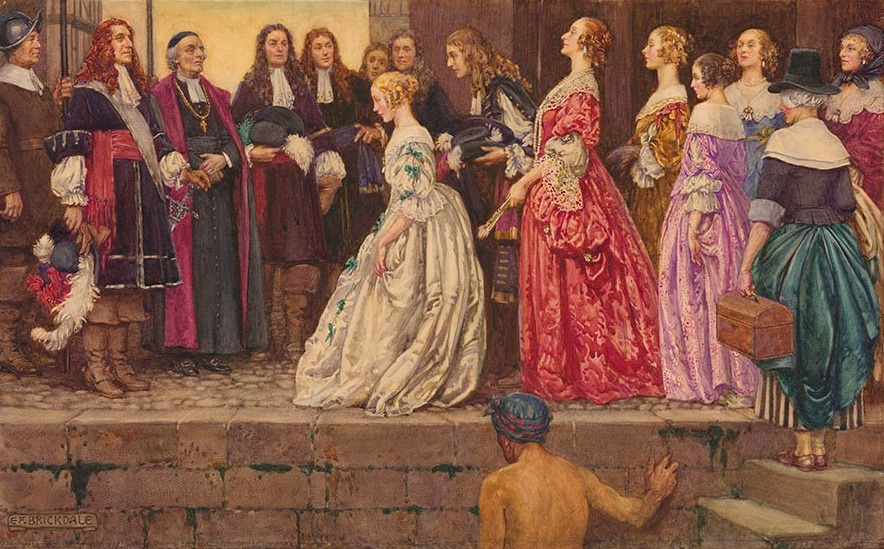
The King's Daughters were sent to the New World to fix the gender imbalance in the colonies and boost population growth.

Early on, colonists borrowed words from Algonquin, a language they frequently interacted with, often to name and describe new aspects of geography, temperature, fauna or flora not present in the Old World. Then, Quebec French's evolution was affected by the French court due to the arrival of the King's daughters. These 800 women were mostly orphaned girls that had been adopted by the state as part of a program sponsored by King Louis XIV, and been educated in convents to become exemplary settlers and wives. Once their training was complete, between 1663 and 1673, they were sent to New France and married among the colonists, instilling the King's French into the population in the process.

In his 1757 Memoir on the State of New France, Bougainville writes:

"Canadians have natural spirit; they speak with ease, they cannot write, their accent is as good as in Paris, their diction is full of vicious phrases, borrowed from the language of the Indians or from marine terms, applied in the ordinary style."

The British conquest of 1759 turned the evolution of French in Quebec and North America upside down. By having ties severed with France, the French spoken in Quebec definitively separated from the French spoken in metropolitan France. Quebec French was then truly born, retaining the peculiarities of the old languages of Oïl (which were almost extinct in France at that point) and the King's French, and being both influenced and threatened by the language of the new English conquerors. Quebec's French continued to evolve in its own direction, retaining some aspects the non-isolated rest of the French-speaking world lost, and, over time, new influences and remoteness formed the regional accents and different dialects of Quebec French.

Canada is estimated to be home to between 32 and 36 regional French accents, 17 of which can be found in Quebec. There are 11 accents exclusive to mainland Quebec; they are the regional accents of Gaspé (Gaspésien), Bas-Saint-Laurent, Saguenay-Lac Saint-Jean (Saguenéen), Quebec-Charlevoix, Beauce (Beauceron), the Eastern Townships, Mauricie-Haute-Mauricie (Magoua), Greater Montreal, Eastern Montreal-Laval, Rouyn-Noranda and Côte-Nord. There are 4 accents off the mainland, 1 on the Isle-aux-Coudres, and 3 on the Îles-de-la-Madeleine: the accents of Villages Medelinots, Havre-aux-Maisons, and Havre-Aubert. Finally, there are 2 accents that cross provincial borders: the accents of Outaouais-Eastern Ontario (Outaouais) and Témiscouata-Madawaska (Brayon). There are also people in Quebec who will naturally speak using Standard Québécois or Joual, both of which are considered sociolects rather than regional accents.

==== Fragility and protection of French ====
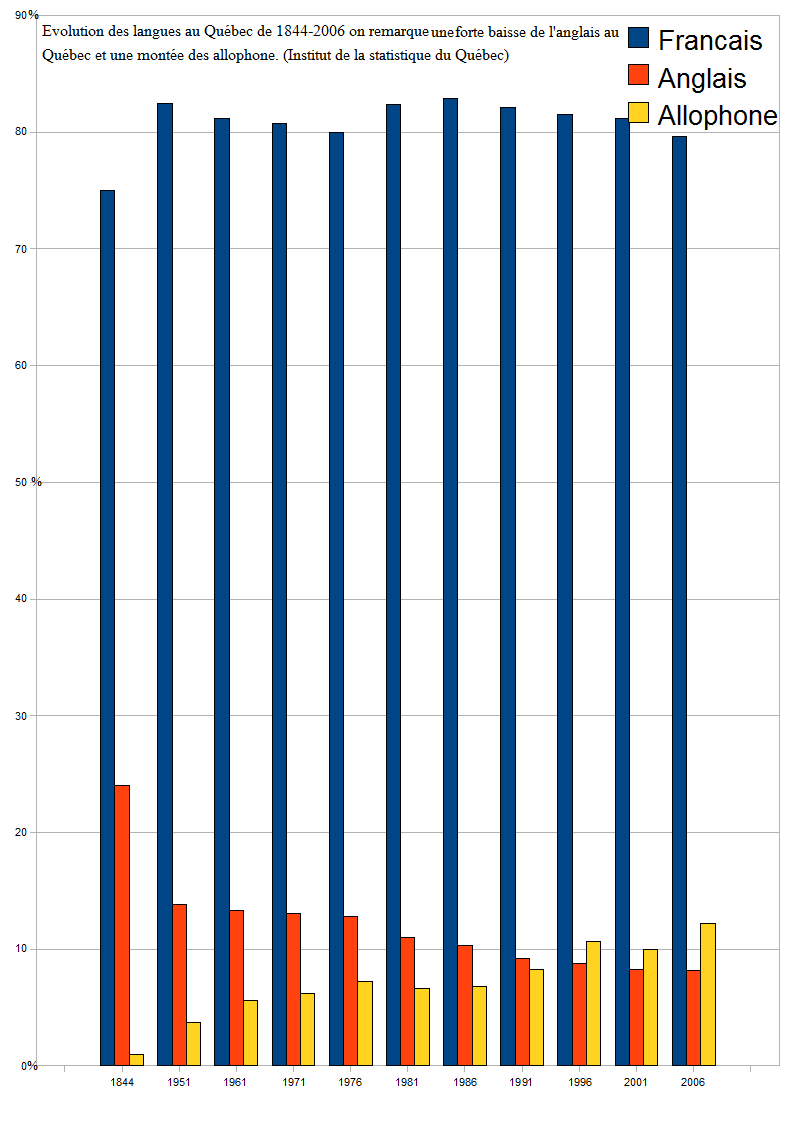
The evolution of the proportion of francophones, anglophones and allophones between 1844 and 2006.

During the days of New France, there began to be an extremely pronounced demographic increase of anglophones versus francophones in North America, a trend which continues to this day. In 1700, for every 250,000 English-speakers, there was 16,500 French-speakers.

After the conquest of 1759, this reality became more brutal for Quebec, which now had to avoid assimilation by the British Empire's regime and survive culturally as well as linguistically.

Still today, as French's demographic weight on the continent and in Canada continues to decline, Quebec faces the threat of assimilation. Since 2011, the population with French as their mother tongue on the Island of Montreal, Quebec's metropolis, has fallen below 50%, with only 49% of the population being francophone due to a sharp increase in the immigrant allophone population (whose mother tongue is neither French nor English).

Efforts have been made to preserve the primacy of the French language in Quebec. Such efforts include: instating the Charter of the French language, Quebec's participation in the Francophonie since 1971, French immigration to Quebec, etc. Several institutions seek to protect and promote French such as the Office québécois de la langue française, the Superior Council of the French Language, the Commission de toponymie du Québec, etc.

=== English ===
As of 2011, English is the mother tongue of nearly 650,000 Quebecers (8% of the population). Anglo-Quebecers constitute the second largest linguistic group in Quebec. In addition, in 2001, roughly 50,000 people (0.7% of the population) considered their mother tongue to be both French and English. According to the latest censuses of 2001, 2006, 2011 and 2016, the percentage of anglophones in the population has more or less stabilized, but in absolute numbers, they are constantly increasing. Allophones, on the other hand, are increasing sharply in absolute numbers as well as in percentage. According to the 2016 census, 49.1% of people living in Quebec say they can conduct a conversation in English (English as mother tongue or as a second language). As for French-English bilingualism, 44.5% of people in Quebec state that they are bilingual, that is to say, able to conduct a conversation in both French and English.

English made its first appearance in Quebec in 1760, when the British invaded and conquered Canada (New France). Shortly afterwards, the first English and Scottish merchants came to settle in the cities of Québec City and Montreal. In 1784, United Empire Loyalists flooded Quebec following their expulsion from the Thirteen Colonies during the United States' War of Independence. This dramatically increased the number of English speakers in Quebec. These Loyalists, avoiding the French-speaking and Catholic countryside, settled mainly in then underdeveloped regions, such as the Eastern Townships and the Outaouais. The proclamation of the Act of Union of 1840 caused massive immigration from the British Isles to Quebec, which introduced Celtic languages for the first time, and was aimed at the linguistic assimilation of the French-speaking population, which had a considerable impact on French-language culture in Quebec. Today, Anglo-Quebecers reside mainly in Montreal and the Pontiac region.

Anglophones in Quebec have several institutions and infrastructural systems. At the school level, anglophones in Quebec have several school boards grouped together into the Association des commissions scolaire anglophones du Québec. In terms of media, anglophones own, among others, the Montreal Gazette in Montreal, and the Chronicle-Telegraph in Quebec City. Other organisations include the Quebec Writers' Federation, which is a group of English-speaking Quebec authors, and the Voice of English-speaking Quebec, which represents the interests of the English-speaking community in the Québec region.

=== Other languages ===
The term "allophone" is used to refer to people whose mother tongue is neither French nor English. We can distinguish two groups of allophones: people who speak indigenous languages, and those who speak so-called immigrant languages.

In the 2016 census, where one could note more than one language as their mother tongue, Quebec had 1,171,045 people (14.5% of the population) who reported a mother tongue that was neither French nor English, and 1,060,830 people (13.2% of the population) who did not declare French or English as a mother tongue at all. In this census, 47,025 (0.6% of the population) reported an aboriginal language as a mother tongue, while 1,124,020 (13.9% of the population) reported an immigrant language as a mother tongue.

=== Indigenous languages ===
Three families of aboriginal languages exist in Quebec, which encompass eleven languages. Each of these languages belong to and are spoken by members of a specific ethnic group. Sometimes, the language in question is spoken natively by all members of the group, sometimes they are spoken only by a few individuals. These languages are also sometimes sub-divided into different dialects in the indigenous communities.

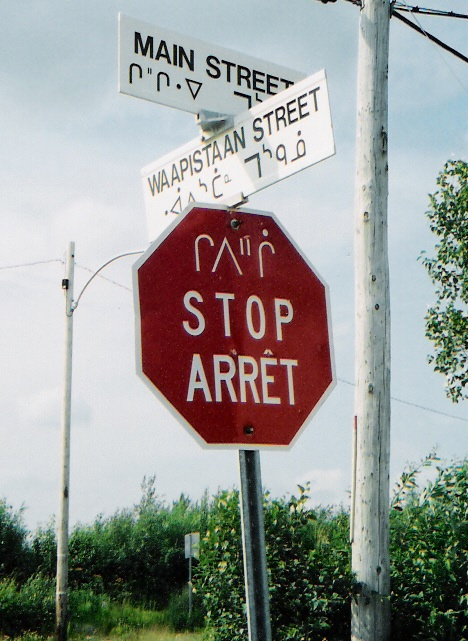
A multilingual road sign in Mistissini, showing Cree, English and French.

- Algonquian language family
  - Abenaki (spoken by the Abenakis of Centre-du-Québec)
  - Algonquin (spoken by the Algonquins of the Outaouais)
  - Maliseet-Passamaquoddy (spoken by the Wolastoqiyik of Bas-Saint-Laurent)
  - Mi'kmaq (spoken by the Micmacs of Gaspésie and the Magdalen Islands)
  - the linguistic continuum of:
    - Atikamekw (spoken by the Attikameks of Lanaudière and Mauricie)
    - Cree (spoken by the Crees of Nord-du-Québec)
    - Innu-aimun (spoken by the Innu-Montagnais of the Côte-Nord and Saguenay-Lac-Saint-Jean)
    - Naskapi (spoken by the Innu-Naskapi of the Côte-Nord)
- Inuit-Aleut language family
  - Nunavimmiutitut (Inuktitut dialect spoken by the Inuit of Nord-du-Québec)
- Iroquoian language family
  - Mohawk, also known as "agnier" (spoken by the Iroquois-Mohawks of Montérégie and the Laurentides)
  - Wendat (spoken by the Wendat of the Capitale-Nationale)

In the 2016 census, 50,895 people in Quebec said they knew at least one indigenous language. Furthermore, 45,570 people declared having an aboriginal language as their mother tongue. For 38,995 of them, it was the language most frequently spoken at home. Additionally, 1,195 people who did not have an aboriginal language as their mother tongue reported using an aboriginal language most often at home.

In Quebec, most indigenous languages are currently transmitted quite well from one generation to the next with a mother tongue retention rate of 92%.

=== Immigrant languages ===
In the 2016 census, 1,124,020 people declared having an immigrant language as their mother tongue in Quebec. The most cited languages are Arabic (2.5% of the total population), Spanish (1.9%), Italian (1.4%), Creole languages (mainly Haitian Creole) (0.8%) and Mandarin (0.6%).

Both the number and proportion of allophones have been increasing in Quebec since the 1951 census.

In 2015, the vast majority (89%) of young allophone students in Quebec attended French-language schools.

== Religion ==
Religion in Quebec (2021 National Household Survey)
1. Roman Catholicism (53.8%)
2. Other Christian (11.0%)
3. Non-religious (27.3%)
4. Islam (5.10%)
5. Hinduism (0.60%)
6. Sikhism (0.30%)
7. Buddhism (0.60%)
8. Judaism (1.00%)
9. Other religions (0.30%)

Religion, more precisely the Roman Catholic Church, has occupied a central and integral place in Quebec society since the arrival of the first French settlers. However, since the Quiet Revolution and the Second Vatican Council in the 1960s, a real separation between state and religion has developed, and society sees religion as a private matter.

The first mass in what would become Quebec was celebrated in 1535, by the priest accompanying Jacques Cartier. Amerindians were evangelized by Catholic missionaries before the founding of parishes. In 1627, Cardinal Richelieu recited a royal proclamation by Louis XIII that banished all non-Catholics, including Huguenots, from New France. In 1658, the apostolic vicariate of Quebec was founded, followed by the Archdiocese of Quebec in 1674.

The Catholic Church's power is reflected in all areas of culture, from language to the fine arts, theater, literature and film. The golden age for ecclesiastics came in the mid-nineteenth century (around 1840) when the Church, influenced by ultramontanism, concretized its influence. Created in 1966, the Assembly of Catholic Bishops of Quebec deals with current issues concerning ethical and moral values (ex. gay marriage, euthanasia and abortion).

Several holy men and women from Quebec were canonized as saints:

- Saint Brother André Bessette canonized in 2010 by Pope Benedict XVI.
- Saint Kateri Tekakwitha canonized on October 21, 2012 by Pope Benedict XVI.
- Saint Mary of the Incarnation canonized in 2014 by Pope Francis.
- Saint François de Laval canonized in 2014 by Pope Francis.

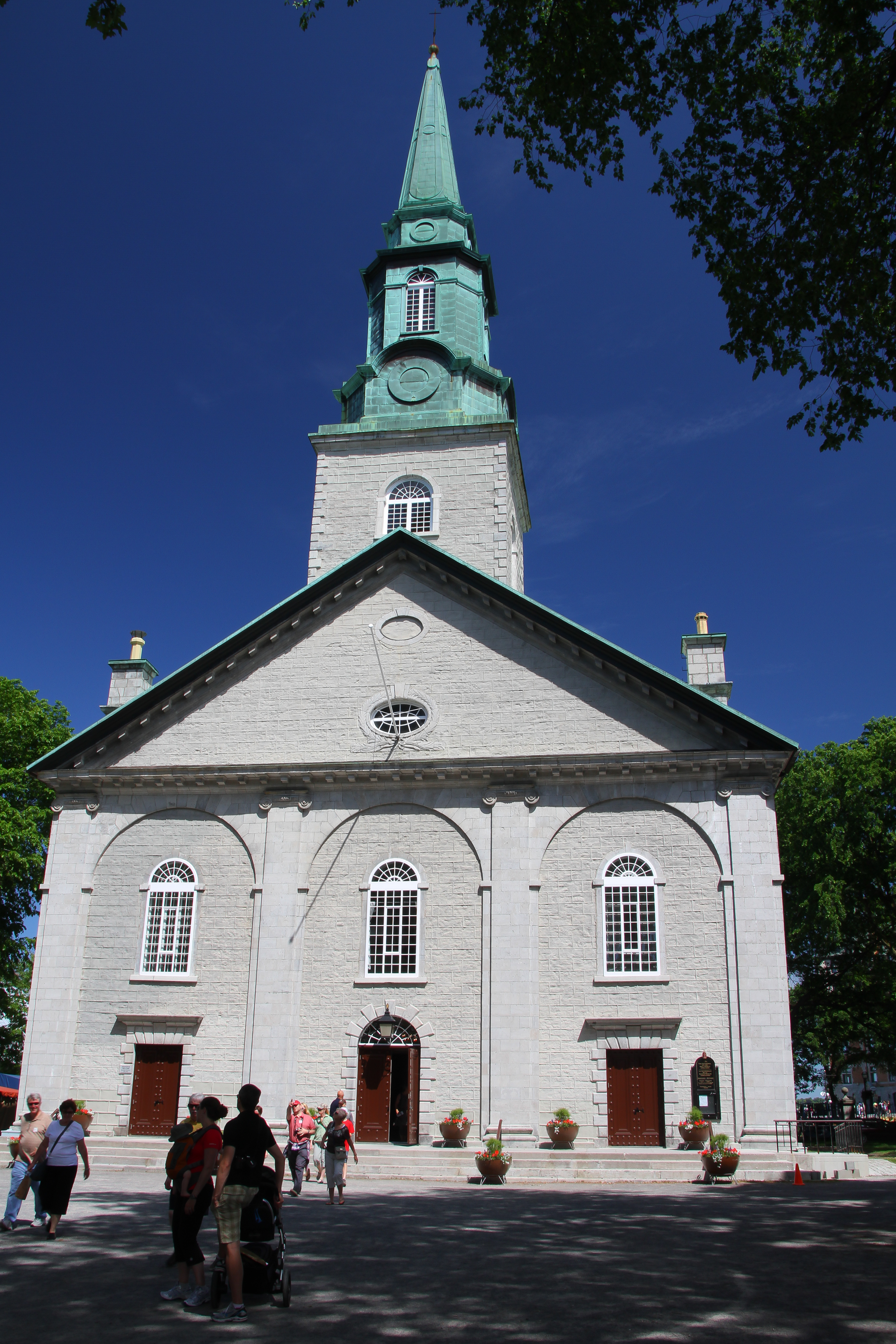
The Cathedral of the Holy Trinity is an important symbol of the Protestant religion in Quebec.

Huguenots of the Calvinist religion arrived early in Quebec. Huguenots appeared in almost all classes of society: settlers, fishermen, daughters of the king, etc. During the early French Regime, the number of Protestant immigrants was estimated at 1,450. In 1627, Protestantism was rejected in New France. After Quebec was conquered by the British, the Protestant religion, more particularly of the Anglican faith, was tolerated.

The Amerindian religions of Quebec preceded Catholicism in Quebec.

While the first synagogue was established in Montreal in 1777, Jews remained negligible until the early 20th century when a wave of Jewish immigrants settled in Montreal. In the 21st century, the Jewish community, mainly on the island of Montreal, numbered about 120,000 people. In 2010, this community was made up of 26.1% traditionalist Jews, 24.3% orthodox, 15.2% conservative, 9% reconstructionist and reformist, and 25.4% of Montreal Jews say they have no religious affiliation.

In the 20th century, successive waves of immigrants from Africa, Asia, Greece, Ireland and Italy settled in Montreal, bringing their cultural and religious customs. Some religious communities, such as Eastern Christians, then established places of worship.

In 2025, there was a reported rise in adult baptisms and an increased number of baptisms of people over the age of 7. The Catholic Church of Quebec described the recent increase in baptisms among adults and adolescents as a "surprising phenomenon … gaining momentum" and that interest in Catholic baptism is "especially present" in young people and in adults from immigrant backgrounds. On Holy Saturday in 2026, it was reported that young people were joining the Catholic Church due to the presence of priests and young influencers on social media. Another reason was an attempt to "understand their identity."

Religious groups in Quebec (1981−2021)
Religious group	2021 Canadian census		2011 Canadian census		2001 Canadian census		1991 Canadian census		1981 Canadian census	
Religious group	Pop.	%	Pop.	%	Pop.	%	Pop.	%	Pop.	%
Christianity	5,385,240	64.82%	6,356,880	82.21%	6,432,430	90.27%	6,349,220	93.23%	6,098,710	95.76%
Irreligion	2,267,720	27.29%	937,545	12.12%	413,190	5.8%	262,800	3.86%	132,935	2.09%
Islam	421,710	5.08%	243,430	3.15%	108,620	1.52%	44,925	0.66%	12,115	0.19%
Judaism	84,530	1.02%	85,100	1.1%	89,920	1.26%	97,730	1.44%	102,355	1.61%
Buddhism	48,365	0.58%	52,390	0.68%	41,375	0.58%	31,635	0.46%	12,000	0.19%
Hinduism	47,390	0.57%	33,540	0.43%	24,525	0.34%	14,125	0.21%	6,690	0.11%
Sikhism	23,345	0.28%	9,275	0.12%	8,225	0.12%	4,525	0.07%	1,790	0.03%
Indigenous spirituality	3,790	0.05%	2,025	0.03%	740	0.01%	170	0%	305	0%
Other	26,385	0.32%	12,340	0.16%	6,555	0.09%	5,170	0.08%	2,170	0.03%
Total responses	8,308,480	97.73%	7,732,520	97.84%	7,125,580	98.45%	6,810,300	98.76%	6,369,070	98.92%
Total population	8,501,833	100%	7,903,001	100%	7,237,479	100%	6,895,963	100%	6,438,403	100%

Main religious denominations in Quebec
	2001		2011		2021	
	Number	%	Number	%	Number	%
Total population	7,125,580	100	7,732,520	100	8,308,480	100
Christianity	6,432,520	90.4	6,356,880	82.2	5,383,240	64.8
Catholicism	5,939,795	83.6	5,775,740	74.7	4,472,555	53.8
Christian (n.o.s)					464,020	5.6
Christian Orthodox	100,375	1.4	129,780	1.7	145,845	1.8
Anglican Church of Canada	85,475	1.2	73,550	1.0	55,290	0.7
Pentecostal	22,670	0.3	39,070	0.5	39,700	0.5
Baptist	35,455	0.5	36,615	0.5	33,755	0.4
United Church of Canada	52,950	0.7	32,930	0.4	19,595	0.2
Presbyterian	8,770	0.1	11,440	0.1	8,010	0.1
Lutheran	9,640	0.1	7,200	0.1	4,875	0.1
Other Christian Denominations^{1}	72,935	1.0	248,560	3.2	141,635	1.8
No religious affiliation	413,185	5.8	937,545	12.1	2,260,720	27.3
Muslim	108,620	1.5	243,430	3.2	421,710	5.1
Jewish	89,920	1.3	85,100	1.1	84,530	1.0
Buddhist	41,375	0.6	52,390	0.7	48,365	0.6
Hindu	24,530	0.3	33,540	0.4	47,390	0.6
Sikh	8,220	0.1	9,275	0.1	23,345	0.3
Indigenous Religion	740	<0.1	2,025	<0.1	3,790	<0.1
Other Religions	6,470	0.1	12,340	0.2	26,385	0.3
^{1} Includes Christian(n.o.s) in 2001 and 2011

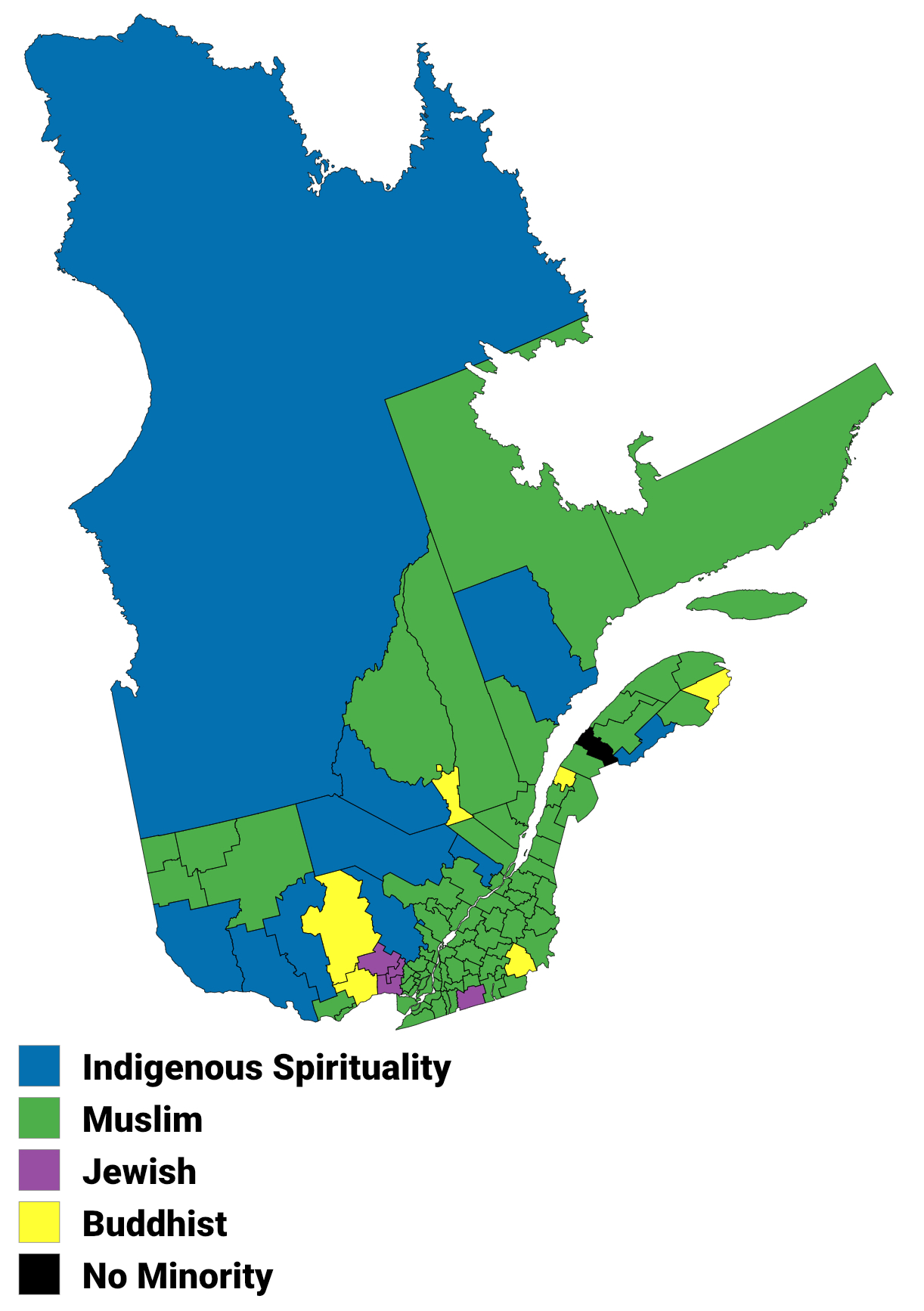
Largest non-Christian religion in Quebec by census division, 2021 census

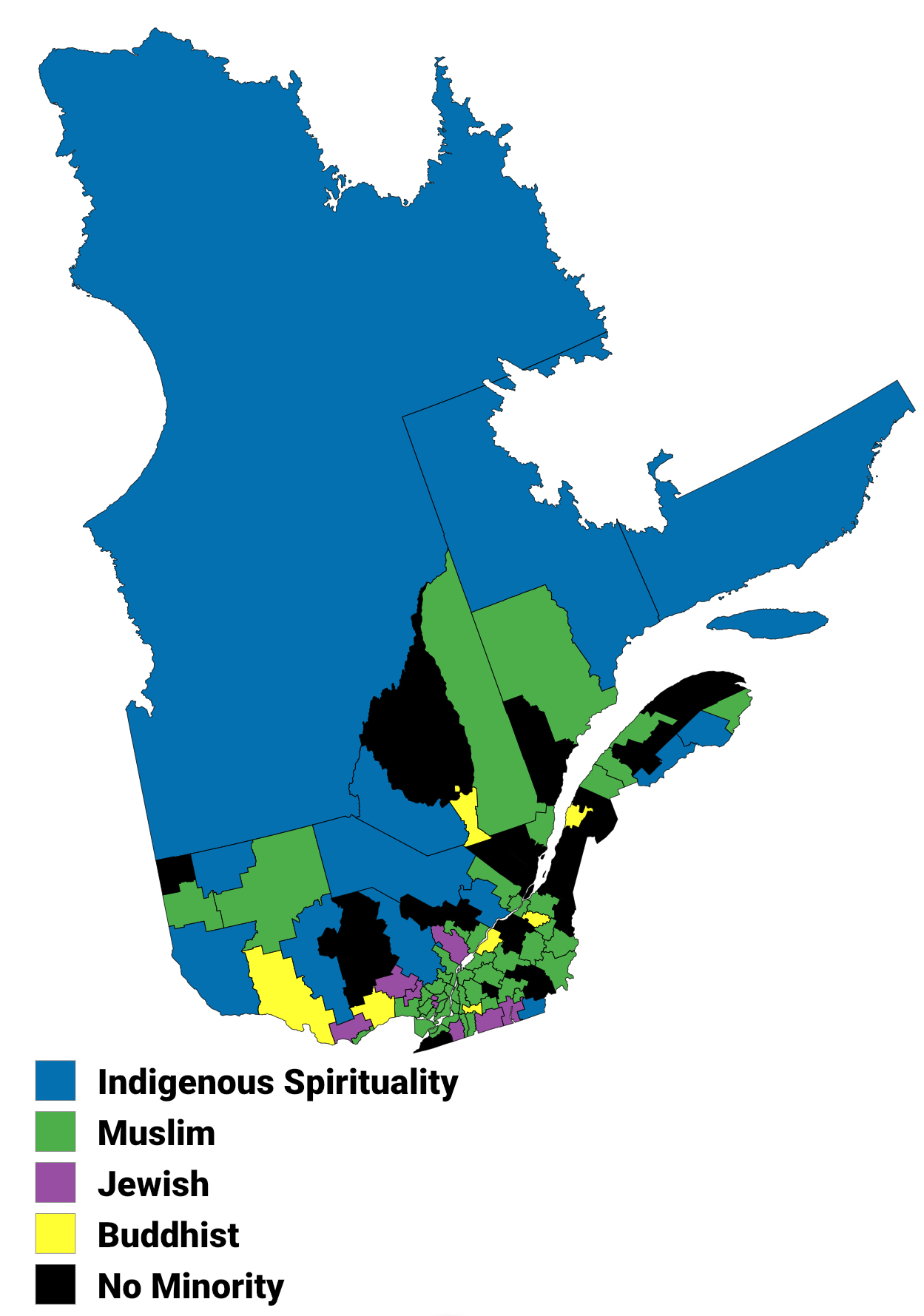
Largest non-Christian religion in Quebec by census division, 2011 census

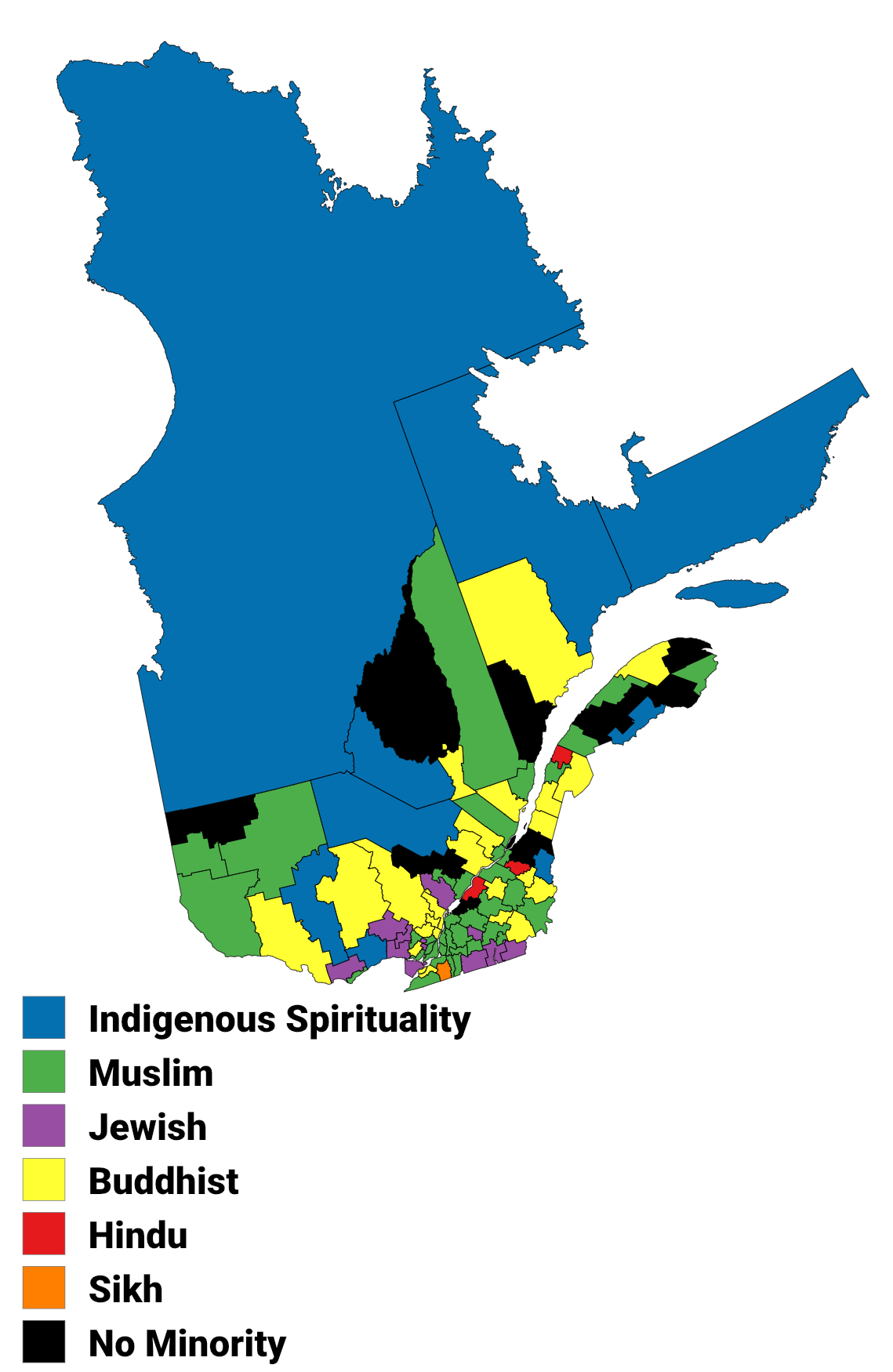
Largest non-Christian religion in Quebec by census division, 2001 census

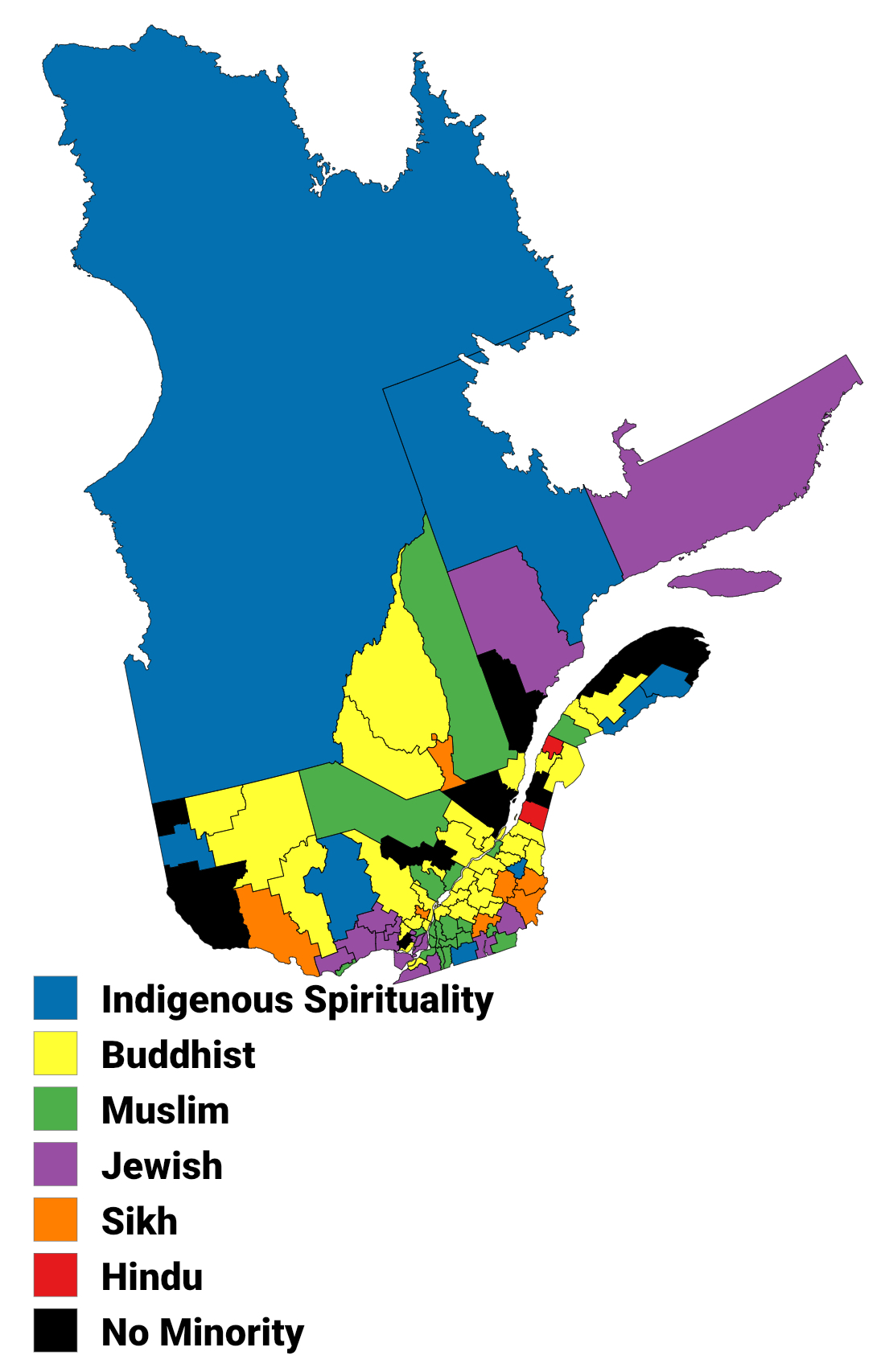
Largest non-Christian religion in Quebec by census division, 1991 census

=== Religion in politics ===
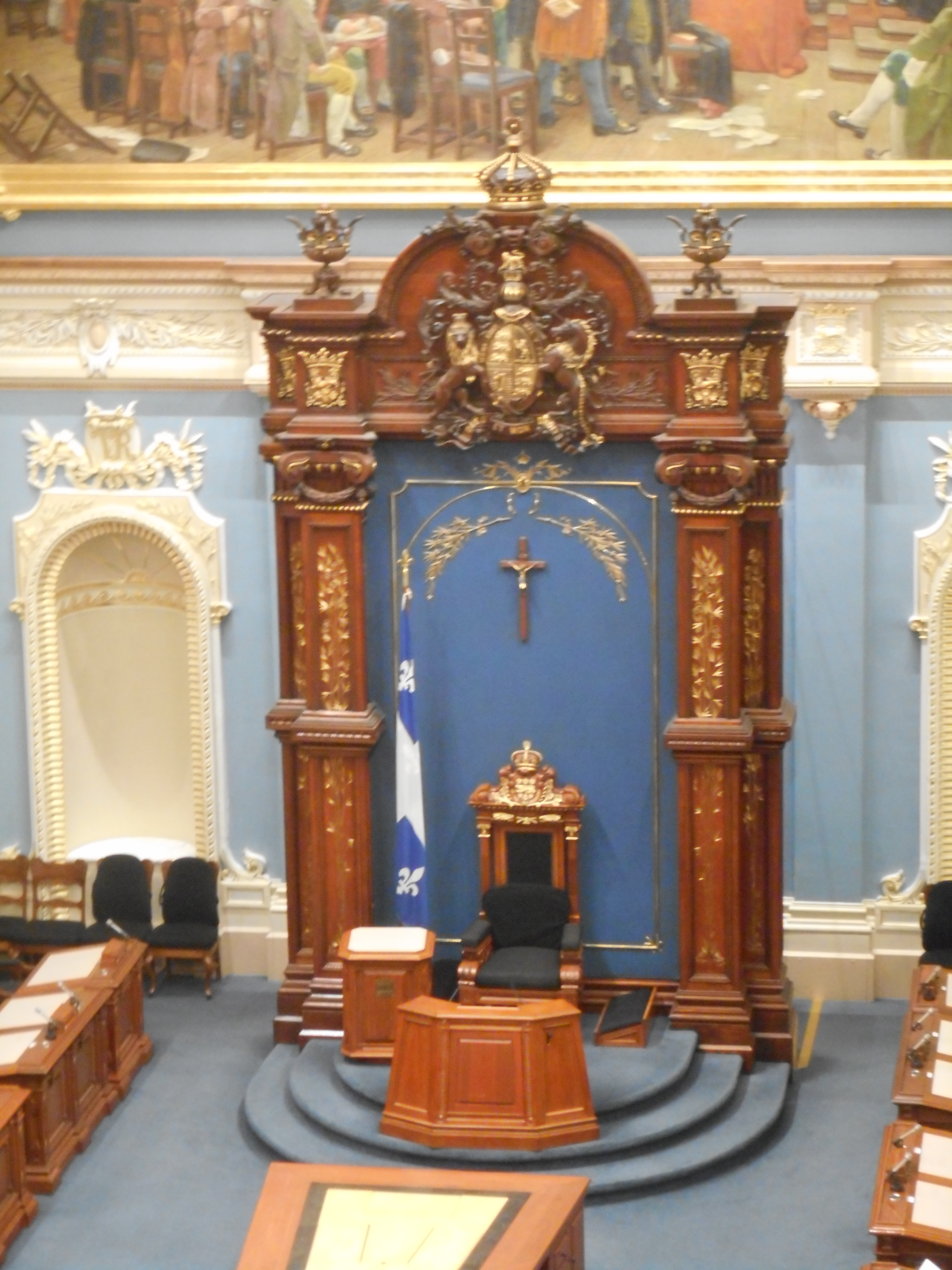
A Crucifix had been hanging above the seat of the National Assembly of Quebec from 1936 until It was removed on July 9, 2019.

The Church formed many provincial institutions, including most French-language schools, hospitals, and charitable organizations. The leader of the Catholic Church in Quebec was the Bishop of Montreal. From 1840 to 1876 the bishop was Ignace Bourget, an opponent of liberalism. Bourget eventually succeeded in gaining more influence than the liberal, reformist Institut Canadien. At his most extreme, Bourget went denied a Church burial to Joseph Guibord, a member of the Institut, in 1874. A court decision forced Bourget to allow the burial, but Bourget deconsecrated the burial plot. Guibord was buried under army protection. In 1876, Pierre-Alexis Tremblay was defeated in a federal by-election because of pressure from the Church, but succeeded in getting his loss annulled under a new federal law. He quickly lost the subsequent election. In 1877, the Pope sent representatives to force the Quebec Church to minimize its interventions in the electoral process.

Lionel Groulx, a Catholic priest, professor, and journalist, wanted to build a nationalistic French-Canadian identity, to protect the power of the Church and dissuade the public from popular-rule and secularist views. Groulx advocatedFrench-Canadian nationalism and argued that maintaining a Roman Catholic Quebec was the only means to 'emancipate the nation against English power.' He believed the powers of the provincial government of Quebec could and should be used within Confederation, to bolster provincial autonomy (and thus Church power), and that it would benefit the French-Canadian nation. Groulx successfully promoted Québécois nationalism and conservative Catholic social doctrine, through which the Church maintained dominance in political and social life. In the 1920s–1950s, this form of traditionalist Catholic nationalism became known as clerico-nationalism.

In 1936, Maurice Duplessis hung a crucifix in the National Assembly of Quebec. It hung there until it was removed on 10 July 2019.

During the 1940s and 1950s, the Union Nationale, party of Premier Maurice Duplessis, often had the active support of the Roman Catholic Church during political campaigns, using the slogan Le ciel est bleu; l'enfer est rouge ("Heaven is blue; hell is red"; red is the colour of the Liberal party, and blue was the colour of the Union Nationale).

Sharia law is explicitly banned in Quebec, upheld by a unanimous vote against it in 2005 by the National Assembly.

=== Churches ===
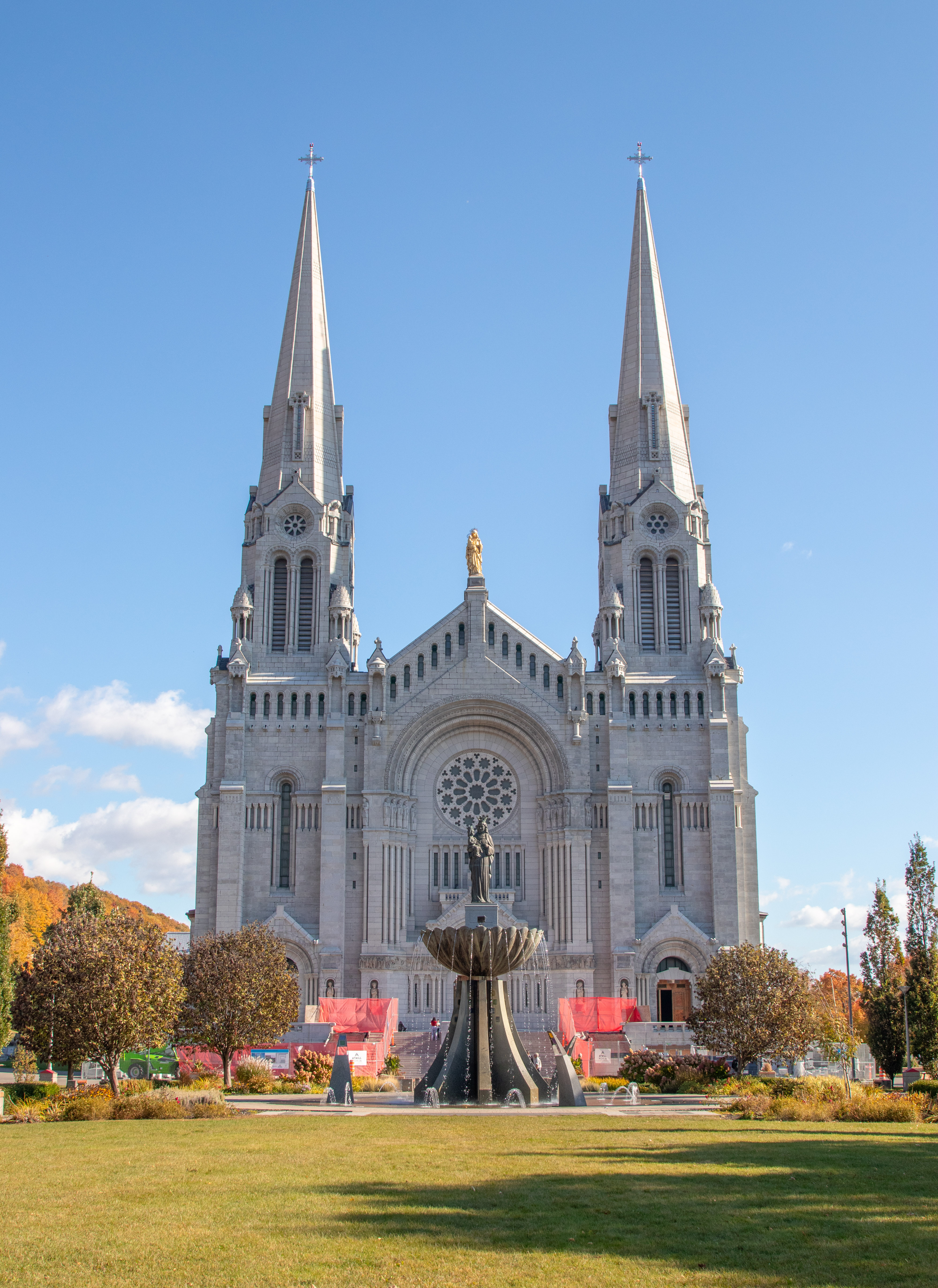
The Basilica of Sainte-Anne-de-Beaupré.

The oldest parish church in North America is the Cathedral-Basilica of Notre-Dame de Québec. Its first mass was celebrated by Father Vimont on December 24, 1650. This church obtained the status of cathedral in 1674, when François de Laval became archbishop of Quebec, and then the status of minor basilica in 1874. It was rebuilt twice after the siege of Quebec in 1759 and a 1922 fire.

The most frequented place of worship in Quebec is the Basilica of Sainte-Anne-de-Beaupré. This basilica welcomes millions of visitors each year, especially during the novena of Saint Anne, on July 26. The Sainte-Anne-de-Beaupré basilica is recognized for its numerous miracles, which is why thousands of crutches can be found at its entrance.

Saint Joseph's Oratory is the largest place of worship in the world dedicated to Saint Joseph. Located beside Mount Royal, it is known for its 283 steps, which pilgrims come to climb on their knees every year, reciting a prayer on each of the steps.

Many pilgrimages include places such as Saint Benedict Abbey, Sanctuaire Notre-Dame-du-Cap, Notre-Dame de Montréal Basilica, Marie-Reine-du-Monde de Montréal Basilica-Cathedral, Saint-Michel Basilica-Cathedral, Saint-Patrick's Basilica, etc.

Another important place of worship in Quebec is the Anglican Holy Trinity Cathedral, which was erected between 1800 and 1804. It was the first Anglican cathedral built outside the British Isles.

== Migration ==
=== Immigration ===
Quebec immigration statistics (1844–2021)
Census year	Immigrant percentage	Immigrant population	Total responses	Total population	Source(s)
1844 Census of Lower Canada	12.51%	87,180	697,084	697,084	
1851 Census of Canada East	10.65%	94,853	890,261	890,261	
1861 Census of Canada East	8.64%	96,002	1,111,566	1,111,566	
1871 Canadian census	6.59%	78,479	1,191,516	1,191,516	
1881 Canadian census	5.6%	76,137	1,359,027	1,359,027	
1891 Canadian census	5.48%	81,521	1,488,535	1,488,535	
1901 Canadian census	5.38%	88,708	1,648,898	1,648,898	
1911 Canadian census	7.33%	147,070	2,005,776	2,005,776	
1921 Canadian census	7.99%	188,565	2,360,510	2,360,510	
1931 Canadian census	8.76%	251,748	2,874,662	2,874,662	
1941 Canadian census	6.72%	223,943	3,331,882	3,331,882	
1951 Canadian census	5.64%	228,923	4,055,681	4,055,681	
1961 Canadian census	7.39%	388,449	5,259,211	5,259,211	
1971 Canadian census	7.78%	468,925	6,027,760	6,027,764	
1981 Canadian census	8.26%	525,955	6,369,070	6,438,403	
1986 Canadian census	8.17%	527,135	6,454,485	6,532,461	
1991 Canadian census	8.68%	591,205	6,810,300	6,895,963	
1996 Canadian census	9.43%	664,495	7,045,085	7,138,795	
2001 Canadian census	9.92%	706,965	7,125,580	7,237,479	
2006 Canadian census	11.45%	851,560	7,435,900	7,546,131	
2011 Canadian census	12.61%	974,895	7,732,520	7,903,001	
2016 Canadian census	13.7%	1,091,305	7,965,450	8,164,361	
2021 Canadian census	14.57%	1,210,595	8,308,480	8,501,833	

The 2021 census reported that immigrants (individuals born outside Canada) comprise 1,210,595 persons or 14.6 percent of the total population of Quebec.

Immigrants in Quebec by country of birth
Country of birth	2021 census		2016 census		2011 census		2006 census		2001 census		1996 census		1991 census		1986 census		1981 census		1971 census		1961 census		1951 census		1941 census		1931 census	
Country of birth	Pop.	%	Pop.	%	Pop.	%	Pop.	%	Pop.	%	Pop.	%	Pop.	%	Pop.	%	Pop.	%	Pop.	%	Pop.	%	Pop.	%	Pop.	%	Pop.	%
France & Belgium	102,335 (Note: France: 93,160 / Belgium: 9,175)	8.5%	90,670 (Note: France: 81,225 / Belgium: 9,445)	8.3%	77,095 (Note: France: 67,650 / Belgium: 9,445)	7.9%	68,355 (Note: France: 59,215 / Belgium: 9,140)	8%	58,625 (Note: France: 50,140 / Belgium: 8,485)	8.3%	53,545 (Note: France: 44,270 / Belgium: 9,275)	8.1%	47,480 (Note: France: 38,265 / Belgium: 9,215)	8%	44,350 (Note: France: 35,440 / Belgium: 8,910)	8.4%	46,615 (Note: France: 37,155 / Belgium: 9,460)	8.9%	42,010	9%	30,217	7.8%	10,106	4.4%	7,476	3.3%	8,816	3.5%
Algeria & Tunisia	93,180 (Note: Algeria: 72,835 / Tunisia: 20,345)	7.7%	74,240 (Note: Algeria: 59,460 / Tunisia: 14,780)	6.8%	56,610 (Note: Algeria: 47,330 / Tunisia: 9,280)	5.8%	35,810 (Note: Algeria: 29,515 / Tunisia: 6,295)	4.2%	20,155 (Note: Algeria: 16,610 / Tunisia: 3,545)	2.9%	10,455 (Note: Algeria: 6,995 / Tunisia: 3,460)	1.6%	5,525 (Note: Algeria: 3,225 / Tunisia: 2,300)	0.9%	3,695 (Note: Algeria: 2,115 / Tunisia: 1,580)	0.7%	3,655	0.7%	—N/a	—N/a	—N/a	—N/a	—N/a	—N/a	—N/a	—N/a	—N/a	—N/a
Haiti	86,105	7.1%	80,965	7.4%	69,075	7.1%	56,755	6.7%	47,850	6.8%	45,470	6.8%	37,210	6.3%	30,155	5.7%	25,850	4.9%	9,685	2.1%	—N/a	—N/a	—N/a	—N/a	—N/a	—N/a	—N/a	—N/a
Lebanon & Syria	69,125 (Note: Lebanon: 42,280 / Syria: 26,845)	5.7%	56,915 (Note: Lebanon: 39,140 / Syria: 17,775)	5.2%	48,600 (Note: Lebanon: 38,570 / Syria: 10,030)	5%	44,275 (Note: Lebanon: 34,875 / Syria: 9,400)	5.2%	37,120 (Note: Lebanon: 28,765 / Syria: 8,355)	5.3%	36,070 (Note: Lebanon: 28,435 / Syria: 7,635)	5.4%	32,605 (Note: Lebanon: 25,930 / Syria: 6,675)	5.5%	12,100 (Note: Lebanon: 8,770 / Syria: 3,330)	2.3%	7,340	1.4%	—N/a	—N/a	—N/a	—N/a	—N/a	—N/a	1,358	0.6%	1,440	0.6%
Morocco	68,870	5.7%	60,695	5.6%	48,375	5%	33,565	3.9%	20,185	2.9%	16,515	2.5%	13,465	2.3%	10,305	2%	9,405	1.8%	—N/a	—N/a	—N/a	—N/a	—N/a	—N/a	—N/a	—N/a	—N/a	—N/a
China & Taiwan	54,995 (Note: China: 52,500 / Taiwan: 2,495)	4.5%	52,290 (Note: China: 49,555 / Taiwan: 2,735)	4.8%	46,645 (Note: China: 43,735 / Taiwan: 2,910)	4.8%	42,355 (Note: China: 39,190 / Taiwan: 3,165)	5%	27,160 (Note: China: 24,405 / Taiwan: 2,755)	3.8%	19,800 (Note: China: 16,460 / Taiwan: 3,340)	3%	12,290 (Note: China: 10,330 / Taiwan: 1,960)	2.1%	8,525 (Note: China: 8,205 / Taiwan: 320)	1.6%	7,300 (Note: China: 3,485 / Taiwan: 3,815)	1.4%	6,160	1.3%	3,356	0.9%	1,474	0.6%	2,027	0.9%	2,506	1%
Italy	43,975	3.6%	51,025	4.7%	57,710	5.9%	65,550	7.7%	69,450	9.8%	74,705	11.2%	78,685	13.3%	84,300	16%	88,895	16.9%	90,375	19.3%	64,822	16.7%	12,447	5.4%	9,195	4.1%	9,797	3.9%
Cameroon & DR Congo	35,980 (Note: Cameroon: 20,380 / DR Congo: 15,600)	3%	24,905 (Note: Cameroon: 12,805 / DR Congo: 12,100)	2.3%	14,265 (Note: Cameroon: 5,110 / DR Congo: 9,155)	1.5%	10,205 (Note: Cameroon: 2,225 / DR Congo: 7,980)	1.2%	6,085 (Note: Cameroon: 1,275 / DR Congo: 4,810)	0.9%	4,095	0.6%	1,675	0.3%	1,075	0.2%	465	0.1%	—N/a	—N/a	—N/a	—N/a	—N/a	—N/a	—N/a	—N/a	—N/a	—N/a
Philippines	31,345	2.6%	24,410	2.2%	22,630	2.3%	16,335	1.9%	13,670	1.9%	10,910	1.6%	7,225	1.2%	4,550	0.9%	4,095	0.8%	—N/a	—N/a	—N/a	—N/a	—N/a	—N/a	—N/a	—N/a	—N/a	—N/a
Colombia	29,670	2.5%	25,575	2.3%	21,320	2.2%	13,390	1.6%	4,385	0.6%	2,790	0.4%	2,595	0.4%	1,935	0.4%	—N/a	—N/a	—N/a	—N/a	—N/a	—N/a	—N/a	—N/a	—N/a	—N/a	—N/a	—N/a
Romania	27,515	2.3%	28,690	2.6%	25,770	2.6%	26,955	3.2%	14,505	2.1%	12,840	1.9%	8,440	1.4%	7,080	1.3%	6,490	1.2%	7,050	1.5%	7,166	1.8%	5,063	2.2%	5,704	2.5%	7,293	2.9%
Vietnam	25,480	2.1%	25,435	2.3%	27,235	2.8%	24,445	2.9%	22,890	3.2%	23,510	3.5%	20,720	3.5%	18,080	3.4%	11,360	2.2%	—N/a	—N/a	—N/a	—N/a	—N/a	—N/a	—N/a	—N/a	—N/a	—N/a
India	24,990	2.1%	17,870	1.6%	16,985	1.7%	16,185	1.9%	14,540	2.1%	13,085	2%	9,705	1.6%	8,420	1.6%	8,230	1.6%	4,150	0.9%	1,022	0.3%	469	0.2%	329	0.1%	356	0.1%
United States	24,945	2.1%	25,960	2.4%	26,780	2.7%	26,575	3.1%	25,255	3.6%	27,130	4.1%	27,770	4.7%	34,750	6.6%	40,415	7.7%	46,480	9.9%	45,933	11.8%	42,286	18.5%	50,229	22.4%	49,406	19.6%
Russia & Ukraine	21,350 (Note: Russia: 11,690 / Ukraine: 9,660)	1.8%	20,015 (Note: Russia: 11,350 / Ukraine: 8,665)	1.8%	18,485 (Note: Russia: 11,455 / Ukraine: 7,030)	1.9%	15,135 (Note: Russia: 9,695 / Ukraine: 5,440)	1.8%	10,555 (Note: Russia: 6,415 / Ukraine: 4,140)	1.5%	7,680 (Note: Russia: 4,350 / Ukraine: 3,330)	1.2%	9,175 (Note: Includes total persons born in all republics of the Soviet Union.)	1.6%	10,895	2.1%	13,245	2.5%	17,065	3.6%	23,333	6%	19,495	8.5%	19,859	8.9%	21,833	8.7%
Egypt	20,325	1.7%	19,495	1.8%	17,240	1.8%	15,830	1.9%	14,850	2.1%	16,585	2.5%	15,690	2.7%	13,555	2.6%	13,715	2.6%	—N/a	—N/a	—N/a	—N/a	—N/a	—N/a	—N/a	—N/a	—N/a	—N/a
Iran	20,235	1.7%	17,760	1.6%	11,675	1.2%	8,830	1%	7,535	1.1%	6,635	1%	5,235	0.9%	1,360	0.3%	—N/a	—N/a	—N/a	—N/a	—N/a	—N/a	—N/a	—N/a	—N/a	—N/a	—N/a	—N/a
El Salvador & Guatemala & Nicaragua	19,125 (Note: El Salvador: 11,515 / Guatemala: 5,715 / Nicaragua: 1,895)	1.6%	18,265 (Note: El Salvador: 11,115 / Guatemala: 5,520 / Nicaragua: 1,630)	1.7%	16,295 (Note: El Salvador: 9,815 / Guatemala: 4,910 / Nicaragua: 1,570)	1.7%	16,750 (Note: El Salvador: 10,330 / Guatemala: 5,000 / Nicaragua: 1,420)	2%	15,185 (Note: El Salvador: 9,320 / Guatemala: 4,460 / Nicaragua: 1,405)	2.1%	15,590 (Note: El Salvador: 9,810 / Guatemala: 4,305 / Nicaragua: 1,475)	2.3%	12,100 (Note: El Salvador: 8,030 / Guatemala: 3,115 / Nicaragua: 955)	2%	5,635 (Note: El Salvador: 3,485 / Guatemala: 1,885 / Nicaragua: 265)	1.1%	2,200	0.4%	—N/a	—N/a	—N/a	—N/a	—N/a	—N/a	—N/a	—N/a	—N/a	—N/a
Mexico	17,395	1.4%	15,820	1.4%	15,260	1.6%	8,615	1%	4,335	0.6%	3,010	0.5%	1,980	0.3%	1,210	0.2%	960	0.2%	—N/a	—N/a	—N/a	—N/a	—N/a	—N/a	—N/a	—N/a	—N/a	—N/a
Portugal	17,000	1.4%	18,985	1.7%	18,615	1.9%	21,420	2.5%	22,520	3.2%	22,850	3.4%	24,155	4.1%	21,215	4%	21,595	4.1%	12,110	2.6%	—N/a	—N/a	—N/a	—N/a	—N/a	—N/a	—N/a	—N/a
Greece	16,130	1.3%	18,420	1.7%	20,650	2.1%	22,270	2.6%	22,485	3.2%	23,730	3.6%	25,700	4.3%	26,080	4.9%	28,635	5.4%	26,315	5.6%	14,062	3.6%	1,559	0.7%	1,112	0.5%	1,294	0.5%
Ivory Coast	14,575	1.2%	8,745	0.8%	4,200	0.4%	1,735	0.2%	955	0.1%	600	0.1%	—N/a	—N/a	—N/a	—N/a	—N/a	—N/a	—N/a	—N/a	—N/a	—N/a	—N/a	—N/a	—N/a	—N/a	—N/a	—N/a
Peru	13,885	1.1%	13,265	1.2%	11,610	1.2%	9,780	1.1%	6,545	0.9%	5,490	0.8%	3,615	0.6%	2,110	0.4%	—N/a	—N/a	—N/a	—N/a	—N/a	—N/a	—N/a	—N/a	—N/a	—N/a	—N/a	—N/a
Cambodia & Laos	12,770 (Note: Cambodia: 9,275 / Laos: 3,495)	1.1%	13,165 (Note: Cambodia: 9,275 / Laos: 3,890)	1.2%	13,935 (Note: Cambodia: 9,875 / Laos: 4,060)	1.4%	12,405 (Note: Cambodia: 8,365 / Laos: 4,040)	1.5%	11,695 (Note: Cambodia: 8,045 / Laos: 3,650)	1.7%	12,245 (Note: Cambodia: 8,450 / Laos: 3,795)	1.8%	12,150 (Note: Cambodia: 7,900 / Laos: 4,250)	2.1%	8,700 (Note: Cambodia: 5,820 / Laos: 2,880)	1.7%	5,820	1.1%	—N/a	—N/a	—N/a	—N/a	—N/a	—N/a	—N/a	—N/a	—N/a	—N/a
United Kingdom	12,290	1%	12,905	1.2%	14,540	1.5%	16,030	1.9%	17,585	2.5%	20,910	3.1%	25,600	4.3%	31,990	6.1%	42,740	8.1%	65,605	14%	77,286	19.9%	71,216	31.1%	76,590	34.2%	92,374	36.7%
Pakistan	11,250	0.9%	10,005	0.9%	8,985	0.9%	9,630	1.1%	6,650	0.9%	3,935	0.6%	2,715	0.5%	2,050	0.4%	2,415	0.5%	1,150	0.2%	—N/a	—N/a	—N/a	—N/a	—N/a	—N/a	—N/a	—N/a
Sri Lanka	10,910	0.9%	10,720	1%	12,295	1.3%	9,725	1.1%	9,390	1.3%	6,770	1%	3,200	0.5%	2,305	0.4%	160	0%	—N/a	—N/a	—N/a	—N/a	—N/a	—N/a	—N/a	—N/a	—N/a	—N/a
Moldova	10,580	0.9%	8,935	0.8%	5,590	0.6%	1,590	0.2%	360	0.1%	80	0%	—N/a	—N/a	—N/a	—N/a	—N/a	—N/a	—N/a	—N/a	—N/a	—N/a	—N/a	—N/a	—N/a	—N/a	—N/a	—N/a
Brazil	9,705	0.8%	7,340	0.7%	5,845	0.6%	2,550	0.3%	1,925	0.3%	1,470	0.2%	1,225	0.2%	890	0.2%	680	0.1%	—N/a	—N/a	—N/a	—N/a	—N/a	—N/a	—N/a	—N/a	—N/a	—N/a
Poland	9,675	0.8%	10,735	1%	11,715	1.2%	13,685	1.6%	15,540	2.2%	17,605	2.6%	19,010	3.2%	19,410	3.7%	19,540	3.7%	22,290	4.8%	25,261	6.5%	21,421	9.4%	13,692	6.1%	13,822	5.5%
Germany & Austria	9,565 (Note: Germany: 8,385 / Austria: 1,180)	0.8%	11,235 (Note: Germany: 9,750 / Austria: 1,485)	1%	12,050 (Note: Germany: 10,425 / Austria: 1,625)	1.2%	13,390 (Note: Germany: 11,515 / Austria: 1,875)	1.6%	14,150 (Note: Germany: 12,245 / Austria: 1,905)	2%	14,810 (Note: Germany: 12,620 / Austria: 2,190)	2.2%	15,385 (Note: Germany: 12,705 / Austria: 2,680)	2.6%	17,485 (Note: Germany: 14,555 / Austria: 2,930)	3.3%	19,760 (Note: Germany: 16,560 / Austria: 3,200)	3.8%	24,520	5.2%	28,214	7.3%	7,563	3.3%	5,631	2.5%	5,686	2.3%
Afghanistan	9,545	0.8%	7,285	0.7%	5,390	0.6%	4,400	0.5%	2,640	0.4%	1,125	0.2%	430	0.1%	190	0%	—N/a	—N/a	—N/a	—N/a	—N/a	—N/a	—N/a	—N/a	—N/a	—N/a	—N/a	—N/a
Former Yugoslavia	9,335	0.8%	9,560	0.9%	9,470	1%	10,655	1.3%	9,665	1.4%	8,035	1.2%	4,940	0.8%	4,830	0.9%	5,600	1.1%	5,300	1.1%	4,532	1.2%	1,359	0.6%	1,451	0.6%	1,658	0.7%
Bangladesh	8,965	0.7%	7,940	0.7%	8,045	0.8%	7,145	0.8%	5,215	0.7%	3,975	0.6%	1,400	0.2%	785	0.1%	315	0.1%	—N/a	—N/a	—N/a	—N/a	—N/a	—N/a	—N/a	—N/a	—N/a	—N/a
Chile	8,530	0.7%	8,450	0.8%	8,090	0.8%	8,350	1%	7,355	1%	7,405	1.1%	6,385	1.1%	5,105	1%	3,900	0.7%	—N/a	—N/a	—N/a	—N/a	—N/a	—N/a	—N/a	—N/a	—N/a	—N/a
Jamaica & Trinidad and Tobago	8,310 (Note: Jamaica: 4,485 / Trinidad and Tobago: 3,825)	0.7%	8,735 (Note: Jamaica: 4,660 / Trinidad and Tobago: 4,075)	0.8%	9,675 (Note: Jamaica: 5,260 / Trinidad and Tobago: 4,415)	1%	9,945 (Note: Jamaica: 5,490 / Trinidad and Tobago: 4,455)	1.2%	10,520 (Note: Jamaica: 5,890 / Trinidad and Tobago: 4,630)	1.5%	10,945 (Note: Jamaica: 5,840 / Trinidad and Tobago: 5,105)	1.6%	11,505 (Note: Jamaica: 7,055 / Trinidad and Tobago: 4,450)	1.9%	10,510 (Note: Jamaica: 6,070 / Trinidad and Tobago: 4,440)	2%	11,890	2.3%	5,530	1.2%	3,695 (Note: All individuals born in the British West Indies.)	1%	815	0.4%	1,199	0.5%	1,362	0.5%
Senegal	8,035	0.7%	6,150	0.6%	4,125	0.4%	1,665	0.2%	1,075	0.2%	825	0.1%	—N/a	—N/a	—N/a	—N/a	—N/a	—N/a	—N/a	—N/a	—N/a	—N/a	—N/a	—N/a	—N/a	—N/a	—N/a	—N/a
Venezuela	7,700	0.6%	5,950	0.5%	4,785	0.5%	3,460	0.4%	2,460	0.3%	1,805	0.3%	1,155	0.2%	810	0.2%	—N/a	—N/a	—N/a	—N/a	—N/a	—N/a	—N/a	—N/a	—N/a	—N/a	—N/a	—N/a
Turkey	7,450	0.6%	6,550	0.6%	7,125	0.7%	6,295	0.7%	5,345	0.8%	5,445	0.8%	4,945	0.8%	3,935	0.7%	3,440	0.7%	—N/a	—N/a	—N/a	—N/a	—N/a	—N/a	319	0.1%	238	0.1%
Mauritius	6,970	0.6%	6,055	0.6%	4,985	0.5%	3,475	0.4%	2,730	0.4%	2,800	0.4%	1,695	0.3%	945	0.2%	—N/a	—N/a	—N/a	—N/a	—N/a	—N/a	—N/a	—N/a	—N/a	—N/a	—N/a	—N/a
Cuba	6,845	0.6%	6,205	0.6%	3,615	0.4%	2,400	0.3%	1,390	0.2%	860	0.1%	455	0.1%	300	0.1%	—N/a	—N/a	—N/a	—N/a	—N/a	—N/a	—N/a	—N/a	—N/a	—N/a	—N/a	—N/a
Burundi	6,470	0.5%	4,290	0.4%	3,390	0.3%	2,385	0.3%	1,115	0.2%	510	0.1%	305	0.1%	175	0%	—N/a	—N/a	—N/a	—N/a	—N/a	—N/a	—N/a	—N/a	—N/a	—N/a	—N/a	—N/a
Bulgaria	6,285	0.5%	5,975	0.5%	5,780	0.6%	4,870	0.6%	1,940	0.3%	1,650	0.2%	695	0.1%	310	0.1%	—N/a	—N/a	—N/a	—N/a	—N/a	—N/a	—N/a	—N/a	126	0.1%	141	0.1%
Dominican Republic	6,230	0.5%	5,445	0.5%	4,555	0.5%	3,700	0.4%	2,715	0.4%	2,760	0.4%	1,370	0.2%	845	0.2%	—N/a	—N/a	—N/a	—N/a	—N/a	—N/a	—N/a	—N/a	—N/a	—N/a	—N/a	—N/a
Israel & Palestine	5,980	0.5%	6,205	0.6%	6,065	0.6%	5,750	0.7%	4,780	0.7%	5,225	0.8%	4,665	0.8%	3,555	0.7%	3,415	0.6%	—N/a	—N/a	—N/a	—N/a	—N/a	—N/a	—N/a	—N/a	—N/a	—N/a
South Korea	5,180	0.4%	4,225	0.4%	4,290	0.4%	3,515	0.4%	3,025	0.4%	2,910	0.4%	2,450	0.4%	1,155	0.2%	380	0.1%	—N/a	—N/a	—N/a	—N/a	—N/a	—N/a	—N/a	—N/a	—N/a	—N/a
Switzerland	5,140	0.4%	5,545	0.5%	5,620	0.6%	5,745	0.7%	5,730	0.8%	5,675	0.9%	4,950	0.8%	4,500	0.9%	5,065	1%	3,970	0.8%	3,221	0.8%	1,425	0.6%	1,106	0.5%	1,213	0.5%
Hong Kong	4,905	0.4%	4,725	0.4%	4,845	0.5%	5,380	0.6%	5,500	0.8%	7,370	1.1%	5,105	0.9%	2,765	0.5%	2,600	0.5%	—N/a	—N/a	—N/a	—N/a	—N/a	—N/a	—N/a	—N/a	—N/a	—N/a
Argentina	4,905	0.4%	4,650	0.4%	4,815	0.5%	4,865	0.6%	2,470	0.3%	2,385	0.4%	2,220	0.4%	1,835	0.3%	1,585	0.3%	—N/a	—N/a	—N/a	—N/a	—N/a	—N/a	—N/a	—N/a	—N/a	—N/a
Guinea	4,600	0.4%	3,905	0.4%	3,000	0.3%	1,600	0.2%	815	0.1%	280	0%	130	0%	55	0%	—N/a	—N/a	—N/a	—N/a	—N/a	—N/a	—N/a	—N/a	—N/a	—N/a	—N/a	—N/a
Nigeria & Ghana	4,275 (Note: Nigeria: 2,210 / Ghana: 2,065)	0.4%	3,245 (Note: Nigeria: 1,335 / Ghana: 1,910)	0.3%	2,975 (Note: Nigeria: 1,215 / Ghana: 1,760)	0.3%	2,570 (Note: Nigeria: 620 / Ghana: 1,950)	0.3%	2,265 (Note: Nigeria: 510 / Ghana: 1,755)	0.3%	2,015 (Note: Nigeria: 470 / Ghana: 1,545)	0.3%	1,335	0.2%	570	0.1%	400	0.1%	—N/a	—N/a	—N/a	—N/a	—N/a	—N/a	—N/a	—N/a	—N/a	—N/a
Iraq	4,090	0.3%	3,735	0.3%	3,860	0.4%	2,295	0.3%	2,375	0.3%	1,710	0.3%	1,270	0.2%	1,015	0.2%	545	0.1%	—N/a	—N/a	—N/a	—N/a	—N/a	—N/a	—N/a	—N/a	—N/a	—N/a
Rwanda	4,015	0.3%	3,135	0.3%	2,390	0.2%	1,530	0.2%	1,410	0.2%	495	0.1%	265	0%	155	0%	—N/a	—N/a	—N/a	—N/a	—N/a	—N/a	—N/a	—N/a	—N/a	—N/a	—N/a	—N/a
Spain	3,910	0.3%	4,000	0.4%	3,455	0.4%	4,215	0.5%	4,315	0.6%	4,890	0.7%	4,750	0.8%	5,670	1.1%	5,705	1.1%	5,025	1.1%	—N/a	—N/a	—N/a	—N/a	161	0.1%	187	0.1%
Hungary	2,930	0.2%	3,320	0.3%	4,430	0.5%	5,030	0.6%	5,525	0.8%	6,855	1%	7,180	1.2%	8,185	1.6%	8,940	1.7%	11,015	2.3%	13,550	3.5%	3,863	1.7%	3,330	1.5%	3,771	1.5%
Kenya & Tanzania & Uganda	2,810 (Note: Kenya: 865 / Tanzania: 1,375 / Uganda: 570)	0.2%	2,340 (Note: Kenya: 780 / Tanzania: 1,105 / Uganda: 455)	0.2%	1,935 (Note: Kenya: 820 / Tanzania: 695 / Uganda: 420)	0.2%	2,230 (Note: Kenya: 765 / Tanzania: 905 / Uganda: 560)	0.3%	1,375 (Note: Kenya: 575 / Tanzania: 490 / Uganda: 310)	0.2%	1,215 (Note: Kenya: 465 / Tanzania: 415 / Uganda: 335)	0.2%	1,170 (Note: Kenya: 485 / Tanzania: 325 / Uganda: 360)	0.2%	1,310 (Note: Kenya: 395 / Tanzania: 385 / Uganda: 530)	0.2%	1,445	0.3%	—N/a	—N/a	—N/a	—N/a	—N/a	—N/a	—N/a	—N/a	—N/a	—N/a
Czech Republic & Slovakia	2,110	0.2%	2,495	0.2%	2,475	0.3%	2,965	0.3%	3,350	0.5%	3,805	0.6%	4,385	0.7%	4,345	0.8%	4,610	0.9%	5,475	1.2%	5,720	1.5%	4,252	1.9%	3,398	1.5%	4,563	1.8%
Australia & New Zealand	1,400	0.1%	1,120	0.1%	1,090	0.1%	990	0.1%	695	0.1%	750	0.1%	880	0.1%	895	0.2%	1,100	0.2%	1,845	0.4%	1,053	0.3%	1,362	0.6%	586	0.3%	484	0.2%
Scandinavia (Note: Includes Denmark, Finland, Iceland, Norway and Sweden.)	1,305	0.1%	1,425	0.1%	1,520	0.2%	1,660	0.2%	1,450	0.2%	1,305	0.2%	1,790	0.3%	1,985	0.4%	2,560	0.5%	3,500	0.7%	4,480	1.2%	3,192	1.4%	3,693	1.6%	5,450	2.2%
Ireland	640	0.1%	820	0.1%	1,060	0.1%	695	0.1%	820	0.1%	995	0.1%	1,205	0.2%	1,455	0.3%	1,010	0.2%	3,465	0.7%	8,073	2.1%	8,754	3.8%	8,473	3.8%	11,305	4.5%
Total immigrants	1,210,595	14.6%	1,091,305	13.7%	974,895	12.6%	851,560	11.5%	706,965	9.9%	664,495	9.4%	591,205	8.7%	527,135	8.2%	525,955	8.3%	468,925	7.8%	388,449	7.4%	228,923	5.6%	223,943	6.7%	251,743	8.8%
Total responses	8,308,480	97.7%	7,965,450	97.6%	7,732,520	97.8%	7,435,900	98.5%	7,125,580	98.5%	7,045,085	98.7%	6,810,300	98.8%	6,454,485	98.8%	6,369,070	98.9%	6,027,765	100%	5,259,211	100%	4,055,681	100%	3,331,882	100%	2,874,255	100%
Total population	8,501,833	100%	8,164,361	100%	7,903,001	100%	7,546,131	100%	7,237,479	100%	7,138,795	100%	6,895,963	100%	6,532,461	100%	6,438,403	100%	6,027,764	100%	5,259,211	100%	4,055,681	100%	3,331,882	100%	2,874,255	100%

=== Recent immigration ===
The 2021 Canadian census counted a total of 202,740 people who immigrated to Quebec between 2016 and 2021.

Recent immigrants to Quebec by country of birth (2016 to 2021)
Country of birth	Population	% recent immigrants
France	20,980	10.3%
Algeria	13,975	6.9%
Syria	13,390	6.6%
China	10,735	5.3%
Morocco	9,510	4.7%
Cameroon	8,835	4.4%
Haiti	8,600	4.2%
Philippines	8,480	4.2%
India	8,460	4.2%
Tunisia	6,640	3.3%
Ivory Coast	6,305	3.1%
Colombia	4,300	2.1%
United States	4,140	2%
Iran	4,130	2%
Democratic Republic of the Congo	4,050	2%
Lebanon	3,620	1.8%
Brazil	2,580	1.3%
Mexico	2,525	1.2%
Afghanistan	2,515	1.2%
Egypt	2,390	1.2%
Burundi	2,290	1.1%
Pakistan	2,160	1.1%
Senegal	2,150	1.1%
Venezuela	1,695	0.8%
Ukraine	1,660	0.8%
Total recent immigrants	202,740	100%

=== Interprovincial migration ===
Since it began being recorded in 1971 until 2018, each year Quebec has had negative interprovincial migration, and among the provinces it has experienced the largest net loss of people due to the effect. Between 1981 and 2017, Quebec lost 229,700 people below the age of 45 to interprovincial migration. Per capita, Quebec has lost significantly fewer people than other provinces. This is due to the large population of the province and the very low migration rate of francophone Quebeckers. However, Quebec receives much fewer than average in-migrants from other provinces.

In Quebec, allophones are more likely to migrate out of the province than average: between 1996 and 2001, over 19,170 migrated to other provinces; 18,810 of whom migrated to Ontario.

Interprovincial migration between Quebec and other provinces and territories by mother tongue
Mother Tongue / Year	1971–1976	1976–1981	1981–1986	1986–1991	1991–1996	1996–2001	2001–2006	2006–2011	2011-2016	Total
French	−4,100	−18,000	−12,900	5,200	1,200	−8,900	5,000	−2,610	−9,940	−45,050
English	−52,200	−106,300	−41,600	−22,200	−24,500	−29,200	−8,000	−5,930	−11,005	−300,635
Other	−5,700	−17,400	−8,700	−8,600	−14,100	−19,100	−8,700	−12,710	−16,015	−111,025

Interprovincial migration in Quebec
	In-migrants	Out-migrants	Net migration
2008–09	20,307	27,726	−7,419
2009–10	21,048	24,306	−3,258
2010–11	19,884	24,647	−4,763
2011–12	20,179	27,094	−6,915
2012–13	16,879	27,310	−10,431
2013–14	16,536	30,848	−14,312
2014–15	16,611	32,753	−16,142
2015–16	19,259	30,377	−11,118
2016–17	19,531	27,658	−8,127
2017–18	20,777	26,470	−5,693
2018–19	24,604	27,653	−3,049
2019–20	33,843	35,066	−1,223

Source: Statistics Canada

== See also ==
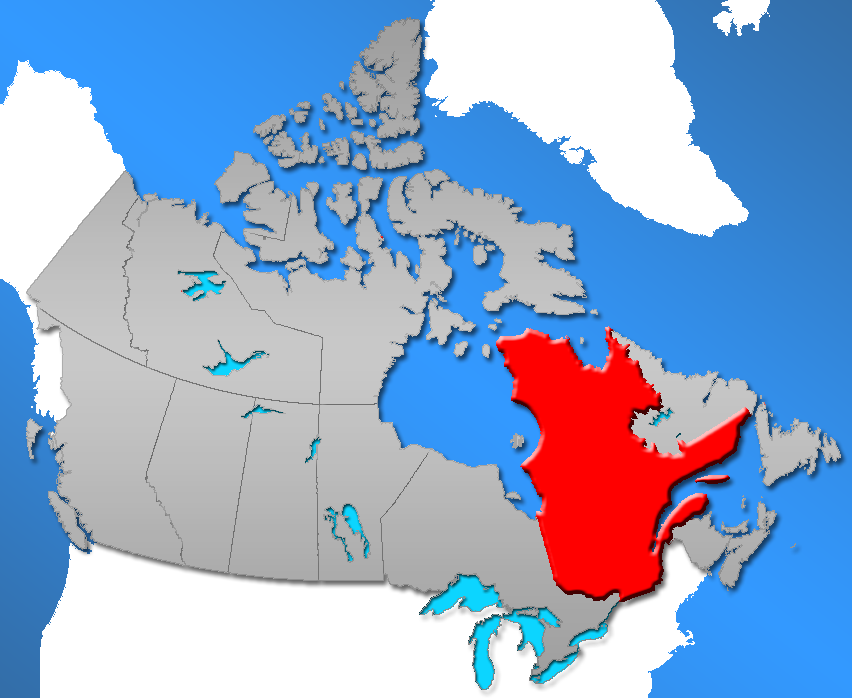
Demographics of Canada's provinces and territories
- Demographics of Canada
- Demographic history of Quebec
- Demolinguistics of Quebec
- Demographics of Montreal
- Cahiers québécois de démographie academic journal
- Immigration to Quebec
- Immigration to Canada
- Population of Canada by province and territory
