= Lists of municipalities in Canada =

Canada has a total of 5,162 municipalities among its 10 provinces and 3 territories that are subject to some form of local government.

== Matrix of municipalities ==
Municipal status	AB	BC	MB	NB	NL	NS	ON	PE	QC	SK	Prov. total	NT	NU	YT	Terr. total	Nat. total
Charter community												3			3	3
City	18	51	10	8	3	(Note: See "regional municipality". Nova Scotia's former incorporated "city" municipal status was abandoned in the 1990s as a result of amalgamations to form regional municipalities.)	51	2	(Note: See "ville". There is no official incorporated "city" municipal status in Quebec.)	16	159	1	1	1	3	162
Community								63			63					63
Community government												4			4	4
County	(Note: See "municipal district" and "specialized municipality". Alberta abolished its incorporated "county" municipal status in the mid-1990s. All were continued as municipal districts but were permitted to retain the term "county" in their official names. Two of these municipal districts, Mackenzie County and Strathcona County, subsequently changed their status from "municipal district" to "specialized municipality".)					9	19				28					28
Cree village									8		8					8
District municipality		50 (Note: Includes the Northern Rockies Regional Municipality, which is incorporated as a "district municipality" despite being named a "regional municipality".)				12					62					62
Hamlet	(Note: In Alberta, "hamlets" are unincorporated communities within incorporated municipalities. See list of hamlets in Alberta.)		(Note: In Manitoba, "hamlets" are not incorporated communities. See Category:Hamlets in Manitoba.)				(Note: In Ontario, "hamlets" are not incorporated communities. See list of hamlets in Ontario.)			(Note: In Saskatchewan, "hamlets", excluding "northern hamlets", are unincorporated communities within incorporated municipalities. See list of hamlets in Saskatchewan.)		11	24	(Note: In Yukon, "hamlets" are not incorporated communities. See list of hamlets in Yukon.)	35	35
Improvement district	8										8					8
Indian government district		1									1					1
Inuit community government					5						5					5
Island municipality		1									1					1
Local government district			2								2					2
Metis settlement	8										8					8
Mountain resort municipality		2									2					2
Municipal district	64					(Note: See "district municipality". Statistics Canada incorrectly reports that Nova Scotia's 12 district municipalities are "municipal districts".)					64					64
Municipality	(Note: See "specialized municipality". Though the Municipality of Crowsnest Pass and the Municipality of Jasper are named "municipalities", they are incorporated as "specialized municipalities".)		(Note: See "rural municipality". Manitoba's 2015 municipal amalgamation reforms created 37 rural municipalities that branded themselves simply as "municipalities" in their official legal names)				58		640		698					698
Naskapi village									1		1					1
Northern hamlet										2	2					2
Northern town										11	11					11
Northern village									14	11	25					25
Parish									158		158					158
Regional municipality	(Note: See "specialized municipality". Though the Regional Municipality of Wood Buffalo is named a "regional municipality", it is incorporated as "specialized municipality".)	(Note: See "district municipality". Though the Northern Rockies Regional Municipality is named a "regional municipality", it is incorporated as a "district municipality".)		1		3	8				12					12
Resort municipality		1									1					1
Resort village	(Note: See "summer village", which is the similar equivalent to Saskatchewan's "resort villages".)									40	40					40
Rural community				7							7					7
Rural municipality	(Note: In Alberta "rural municipalities" are a group of municipal status types including "improvement districts", "municipal districts" and "special areas".)		98 (Note: Statistics Canada incorrectly characterizes 37 rural municipalities as simply municipalities due to their official legal names excluding the term "rural" despite officially holding rural municipality status. Also, Statistics Canada divides the RM of Mountain into two parts.)							296	394					394
Special area	3										3					3
Specialized municipality	5										5					5
Summer village	51									(Note: See "resort village", which is the similar equivalent to Alberta's "summer villages".)	51					51
Town	108	14	25	26	268 (Note: While Statistics Canada reports that there are 277 municipalities in Newfoundland and Labrador (NL), including 3 cities and 274 towns, NL's Department of Municipal Affairs and the Canada Revenue Agency both report there are 271 municipalities in NL.)	26	88	9	(Note: See "ville". There is no official incorporated "town" municipal status in Quebec.)	146	712	4		3	7	719
Township							206		44		250					250
United county							3				3					3
United township							1		2		3					3
Village	89	42	2	65			11		44	260	513	1		4	5	516
Ville									223		223					223
Total municipalities	354	162	137	107	271	50	444	74	1,134	782	3,515	24	25	8	57	3,572
Total population	3,645,257	4,400,057	1,208,268	751,171	514,536	921,727	12,851,821	140,204	7,903,001	1,033,381	33,369,423	41,462	31,906	33,897	107,265	33,476,688
Avg. population	10,297.3	27,160.8	8,819.5	7,020.3	1,898.7	18,434.5	28,945.5	1,894.6	6,969.1	1,321.5	9,493.4	1,727.6	1,276.2	4,237.1	1,881.8	9,372.0

== Lists by province ==
=== Alberta ===
- List of municipalities in Alberta
  - List of cities in Alberta
  - List of improvement districts in Alberta
  - List of Metis settlements in Alberta
  - List of municipal districts in Alberta
  - List of special areas in Alberta
  - List of specialized municipalities in Alberta
  - List of summer villages in Alberta
  - List of towns in Alberta
  - List of villages in Alberta

=== British Columbia ===
- List of municipalities in British Columbia
  - List of cities in British Columbia
  - List of district municipalities in British Columbia
  - List of towns in British Columbia
  - List of villages in British Columbia

=== Manitoba ===
- List of municipalities in Manitoba
  - List of cities in Manitoba
  - List of rural municipalities in Manitoba
  - List of towns in Manitoba
  - List of villages in Manitoba

=== New Brunswick ===
- List of municipalities in New Brunswick
  - List of cities in New Brunswick
  - List of rural communities in New Brunswick
  - List of towns in New Brunswick
  - List of villages in New Brunswick

=== Newfoundland and Labrador ===
- List of municipalities in Newfoundland and Labrador
  - List of cities in Newfoundland and Labrador
  - List of towns in Newfoundland and Labrador

=== Nova Scotia ===
- List of municipalities in Nova Scotia
  - List of counties of Nova Scotia
  - List of municipal districts in Nova Scotia
  - List of regional municipalities in Nova Scotia
  - List of towns in Nova Scotia

=== Ontario ===
- List of municipalities in Ontario
  - List of cities in Ontario
  - List of towns in Ontario
  - List of township municipalities in Ontario
  - List of villages in Ontario
- Former municipalities in Ontario

=== Prince Edward Island ===
- List of municipalities in Prince Edward Island
  - List of cities in Prince Edward Island
  - List of towns in Prince Edward Island

=== Quebec ===
- List of municipalities in Quebec
  - List of northern villages in Quebec
  - List of parish municipalities in Quebec
  - List of township municipalities in Quebec
  - List of united township municipalities in Quebec
  - List of village municipalities in Quebec
  - List of villes in Quebec

=== Saskatchewan ===
- List of municipalities in Saskatchewan
  - List of cities in Saskatchewan
  - List of northern municipalities in Saskatchewan
  - List of resort villages in Saskatchewan
  - List of rural municipalities in Saskatchewan
  - List of towns in Saskatchewan
  - List of villages in Saskatchewan

== See also ==
- List of the largest cities and towns in Canada by area
- List of the largest municipalities in Canada by population
