= List of towns in Canada =

This is a list of towns in Canada. Only municipalities currently incorporated as towns are listed here.

== Alberta ==
Alberta has 107 towns.

== British Columbia ==
British Columbia has 14 towns.

== Manitoba ==
Manitoba has 25 towns.

== New Brunswick ==
New Brunswick has 27 towns.

== Newfoundland and Labrador ==
Newfoundland and Labrador has 277 towns.

== Northwest Territories ==
The Northwest Territories has four towns.

Name	Population (2021)	Population (2016)	Change (%)	Area (km^{2})	Population density
Fort Smith	2,248	2,542	−11.6%	91.21	24.6
Hay River	3,169	3,528	−10.2%	122.40	25.9
Inuvik	3,137	3,243	−3.3%	62.68	50.0
Norman Wells	673	778	−13.5%	82.09	8.2
Total towns	9,227	10,091	−8.6%	358.38	25.7

== Nova Scotia ==
Nova Scotia has 30 towns.

== Ontario ==
Ontario has 89 towns.

== Prince Edward Island ==
Prince Edward Island has seven towns.

== Quebec ==
Quebec does not officially differentiate between towns and cities as the general French term for both is "Ville". Quebec has 222 villas.

== Saskatchewan ==
Saskatchewan has 146 towns.

== Yukon ==
Yukon has seven towns. In their official names, four are branded as villages (Carmacks, Haines Junction, Mayo, and Teslin) while one is branded as a city (Dawson).

Name	Population (2021)	Population (2016)	Change (%)	Area (km^{2})	Population density
Carmacks	588	493	+19.3%	36.87	15.9
Dawson	1,577	1,375	+14.7%	30.91	51.0
Faro	440	348	+26.4%	199.89	2.2
Haines Junction	688	613	+12.2%	34.30	20.1
Mayo	188	200	−6.0%	0.98	191.8
Teslin	239	255	−6.3%	3.77	63.4
Watson Lake	1,133	1,083	+4.6%	109.77	10.3
Total towns	4,853	4,367	+11.1%	416.49	11.7

== See also ==
- History of cities in Canada
- Population of Canada by province and territory
- List of census metropolitan areas and agglomerations in Canada
- List of cities and towns of Upper Canada
- List of cities in Canada
- List of cities in North America
- List of city nicknames in Canada
- List of largest Canadian cities by census
- List of the largest cities and towns in Canada by area
- List of the largest municipalities in Canada by population
- List of the largest population centres in Canada
- List of villages in Canada
- Origins of names of cities in Canada
- Population of Canada by year
- Regional municipality
