= List of the largest cities and towns in Canada by area =

Canadian municipalities by area

Canada had 1,137 municipalities that held city, town or ville (Note: According to Statistics Canada, both "city" and "town" can translate to "ville" in French. Thus, those municipalities in Quebec holding "ville" status are considered equivalents of cities or towns for the purpose of this list.) status as of 2011. This list presents the 100 largest of these municipalities by land area in square kilometres at the time of the 2011 census.

The geographically massive cities in Quebec – three of them larger than the entire province of Prince Edward Island – were created in the 1990s, when the provincial government added some vast unorganized areas (territoires non organisés) into self-governing municipalities, centred on a single dominant urban centre and surrounded by extensive tracts of forest and sparsely populated expanses.

The geographically massive cities in Ontario were created in the 1990s, when the provincial government converted some counties and regional municipalities into self-governing rural single-tier municipalities, centred on a single dominant urban centre and what were formerly its suburbs and relatively nearby satellite towns and villages, including large tracts of rural land. (This article uses loose imprecise translation of “Ville” and the first 4 on the list are “Municipalities” and not “Cities”)

== List ==
Rank	Municipality	Province	Status	Area (km^{2})
1	La Tuque	Quebec	Ville	28,099.0
2	Senneterre	Quebec	Ville	16,324.0
3	Rouyn-Noranda	Quebec	Ville	6,441.0
4	Val-d'Or	Quebec	Ville	3,955.0
5	Greater Sudbury	Ontario	City	3,201.0
6	Kawartha Lakes	Ontario	City	3,059.0
7	Timmins	Ontario	City	2,962.0
8	Ottawa	Ontario	City	2,778.0
9	Chatham-Kent	Ontario	City	2,457.90
10	Gillam	Manitoba	Town	1,996.34
11	Sept-Îles	Quebec	Ville	1,764.13
12	Norfolk County	Ontario	City	1,607.6
13	Leaf Rapids	Manitoba	Town	1,272.87
14	Haldimand County	Ontario	City	1,251.57
15	Snow Lake	Manitoba	Town	1,211.89
16	Saguenay	Quebec	Ville	1,126.48
17	Gaspé	Quebec	Ville	1,121.07
18	Hamilton	Ontario	City	1,117.23
19	Port-Cartier	Quebec	Ville	1,101.31
20	Prince Edward County	Ontario	City	1,050.45
21	Lynn Lake	Manitoba	Town	910.23
22	Brant	Ontario	City	843.29
23	Calgary	Alberta	City	825.29
24	Shawinigan	Quebec	Ville	733.48
25	Témiscaming	Quebec	Ville	718.18
26	Elliot Lake	Ontario	City	714.56
27	Huntsville	Ontario	Town	710.64
28	Chibougamau	Quebec	Ville	699.31
29	Caledon	Ontario	Town	688.15
30	Edmonton	Alberta	City	684.37
31	Saint-Raymond	Quebec	Ville	670.75
32	Laurentian Hills	Ontario	Town	640.48
33	Toronto	Ontario	City	630.21
34	Bracebridge	Ontario	Town	625.66
35	Iroquois Falls	Ontario	Town	599.92
36	Mont-Laurier	Quebec	Ville	590.76
37	Dégelis	Quebec	Ville	556.64
38	Belleterre	Quebec	Ville	551.29
39	Moosonee	Ontario	Town	550.12
40	Baie-Saint-Paul	Quebec	Ville	546.71
41	Cochrane	Ontario	Town	539.02
42	South Bruce Peninsula	Ontario	Town	538.32
43	Kearney	Ontario	Town	531.31
44	Lakeshore	Ontario	Town	530.32
45	Blind River	Ontario	Town	526.46
46	Mississippi Mills	Ontario	Town	519.53
47	Gravenhurst	Ontario	Town	518.59
48	Northeastern Manitoulin and the Islands	Ontario	Town	495.68
49	Quinte West	Ontario	City	494.15
50	Mirabel	Quebec	Ville	485.59
51	Fermont	Quebec	Ville	470.67
52	Winnipeg	Manitoba	City	464.08
53	Greater Napanee	Ontario	Town	461.31
54	La Malbaie	Quebec	Ville	459.34
55	Rivière-Rouge	Quebec	Ville	455.35
56	Quebec City	Quebec	Ville	454.1
57	Kingston	Ontario	City	451.17
58	Lévis	Quebec	Ville	449.31
59	St. John's	Newfoundland and Labrador	City	446.06
60	Bécancour	Quebec	Ville	440.74
61	Percé	Quebec	Ville	432.39
62	Amos	Quebec	Ville	430.67
63	London	Ontario	City	420.57
64	Chandler	Quebec	Ville	419.53
65	Whitehorse	Yukon	City	416.54
66	Gracefield	Quebec	Ville	386.21
67	Abbotsford	British Columbia	City	375.55
68	Baie Verte	Newfoundland and Labrador	Town	371.09
69	Montreal	Quebec	Ville	365.13
70	Saint-Félicien	Quebec	Ville	363.57
71	Milton	Ontario	Town	363.22
72	Sherbrooke	Quebec	Ville	353.49
73	Gatineau	Quebec	Ville	342.98
74	Pohénégamook	Quebec	Ville	340.33
75	Rimouski	Quebec	Ville	339.84
76	Baie-Comeau	Quebec	Ville	338.99
77	Thunder Bay	Ontario	City	328.24
78	North Bay	Ontario	City	319.05
79	Plympton-Wyoming	Ontario	Town	318.76
80	Prince George	British Columbia	City	318.26
81	Surrey	British Columbia	City	316.41
82	Saint John	New Brunswick	City	315.82
83	Happy Valley-Goose Bay	Newfoundland and Labrador	Town	305.85
84	Minto	Ontario	Town	300.57
85	Kamloops	British Columbia	City	299.23
86	Clarence-Rockland	Ontario	City	297.86
87	Erin	Ontario	Town	297.75
88	Cookshire-Eaton	Quebec	Ville	295.95
89	Dolbeau-Mistassini	Quebec	Ville	295.67
90	Mississauga	Ontario	City	292.4
91	Trois-Rivières	Quebec	Ville	288.9
92	Georgina	Ontario	Town	287.72
93	The Blue Mountains	Ontario	Town	287.23
94	Innisfil	Ontario	Town	284.21
95	Essex	Ontario	Town	277.92
96	Mono	Ontario	Town	277.78
97	Halton Hills	Ontario	Town	276.25
98	New Tecumseth	Ontario	Town	274.18
99	Vaughan	Ontario	City	273.52
100	Brampton	Ontario	City	266.34

== See also ==
- List of the largest municipalities in Canada by population
- List of the largest population centres in Canada
- List of census metropolitan areas and agglomerations in Canada
- List of largest Canadian cities by census
- Population of Canada by province and territory
- Population of Canada by year
- List of cities in Canada
- List of towns in Canada
- Regional municipality
