= Population of Canada by province and territory =

Map of Canadian provinces and territories by population (2021). Legend: >10 million 5 million to 10 million 1 million to 5 million 500 thousand to 1 million 100 thousand to 500 thousand <100 thousand

Canada is divided into 10 provinces and three territories. The majority of Canada's population is concentrated in the areas close to the Canada–US border. Its four largest provinces by area (Ontario, Quebec, British Columbia, and Alberta) are also its most populous; together they account for 86.5 percent of the country's population. The territories (the Northwest Territories, Nunavut, and Yukon) account for over a third of Canada's area but are home to only 0.32 percent of its population, which skews the national population density value.

Canada's population grew by 5.24 percent between the 2016 and 2021 censuses. With the exceptions of Newfoundland and Labrador and the Northwest Territories, all territories and provinces increased in population from 2016 to 2021. In terms of percent change, the fastest-growing province or territory was Yukon with an increase of 12.1 percent between 2016 and 2021, followed by Prince Edward Island with 7.99 percent growth.

Generally, provinces steadily grew in population along with Canada. However, some provinces such as Saskatchewan, Prince Edward Island, and Newfoundland and Labrador experienced long periods of stagnation or population decline. Ontario and Quebec were always the two most populous provinces in Canada, with over 60 percent of the population at any given time. The demographic importance of the West steadily grew over time, while the importance of Atlantic Canada steadily slipped. Canada's population has increased every year since Confederation in 1867.

Data
	Name	2021 census		Growth (2016–2021)	Land area (km^{2})	Density per (km^{2})	House		Senate	
	Name	Pop.	%	Growth (2016–2021)	Land area (km^{2})	Density per (km^{2})	Seats	%	Seats	%
1	Ontario	14,223,942	38.45%	5.8%	1,076,395	15.2	122	35.6%	24	22.9%
2	Quebec	8,501,833	22.98%	4.1%	1,542,057	6.5	78	22.7%	24	22.8%
3	British Columbia	5,000,879	13.52%	7.6%	944,735	5.4	43	12.5%	6	5.7%
4	Alberta	4,262,635	11.52%	4.8%	640,330.46	6.7	37	10.8%	6	5.7%
5	Manitoba	1,342,153	3.63%	5.0%	552,370.99	2.3	14	4.1%	6	5.7%
6	Saskatchewan	1,132,505	3.06%	3.1%	588,243.54	2.0	14	4.1%	6	5.7%
7	Nova Scotia	969,383	2.62%	5.0%	52,942.27	18.4	11	3.2%	10	9.5%
8	New Brunswick	775,610	2.09%	3.8%	71,388.81	10.9	10	2.9%	10	9.5%
9	Newfoundland and Labrador	510,550	1.38%	−1.8%	370,514.08	1.4	7	2.0%	6	5.7%
10	Prince Edward Island	154,331	0.42%	8.0%	5,686.03	27.2	4	1.2%	4	3.8%
11	Northwest Territories	41,070	0.11%	−1.7%	1,143,793.86	0.04	1	0.3%	1	0.95%
12	Yukon	40,232	0.11%	12.1%	474,712.68	0.08	1	0.3%	1	0.95%
13	Nunavut	36,858	0.10%	2.5%	1,877,778.53	0.02	1	0.3%	1	0.95%
Total	Canada	36,991,981	100%	5.2%	8,965,588.85	4.2	343	100%	105	100%

== Population growth rate ==
Map of Canadian provinces and territories by population growth rate (2016–2021). < 4.0% 4.0%–7.0% 7.0%–10.0% > 10.0% population decline

Current provinces and territories population growth rate are based on the Statistics Canada 2021 Census of Population.

Rank	Name	2021 census	2016 census	Change
1	Yukon	40,232	35,874	+12.15%
2	Prince Edward Island	154,331	142,907	+7.99%
3	British Columbia	5,000,879	4,648,055	+7.59%
4	Ontario	14,223,942	13,448,494	+5.77%
5	Manitoba	1,342,153	1,278,365	+4.99%
6	Nova Scotia	969,383	923,598	+4.96%
7	Alberta	4,262,635	4,067,175	+4.81%
8	Quebec	8,501,833	8,164,361	+4.13%
9	New Brunswick	775,610	747,101	+3.82%
10	Saskatchewan	1,132,505	1,098,352	+3.11%
11	Nunavut	36,858	35,944	+2.54%
12	Northwest Territories	41,070	41,786	−1.71%
13	Newfoundland and Labrador	510,550	519,716	−1.76%
Total	Canada	36,991,981	35,151,728	+5.24%

== Demographic evolution ==
=== Historical population ===
The population of Canada increased every year since Confederation in 1867. The first national census of the country was taken in 1871, and it covered the four provinces which were part of Canada at the time. It recorded a population of 1,620,851 in Ontario, 1,191,516 in Quebec, 387,800 in Nova Scotia and 285,594 in New Brunswick The population of each of these provinces continued to grow every year uninterrupted. However, their growth was slow in the late 19th century because there were few economic opportunities. As a result, many Canadians opted to emigrate to the United States for work.

This phenomenon hit Quebec especially hard. Approximately 900,000 Quebec residents (French Canadian for the great majority) left for the United States between 1840 and 1930. However, Quebec's population losses to emigration during this period were largely offset by its natural population growth. Indeed, until the middle of the 20th century, Quebec had a birth rate considerably higher than most of its contemporary industrialized societies. This period of high French-Canadian population growth is nicknamed La Revanche des berceaux (lit: 'the revenge of the cradle').

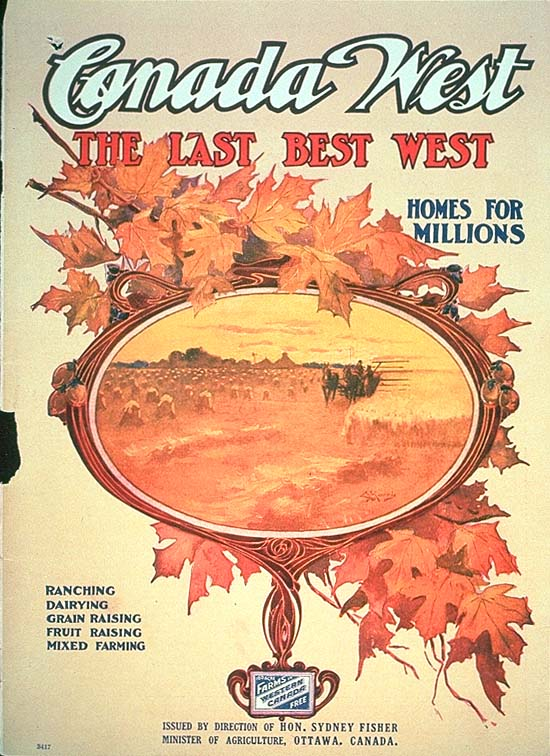
Pamphlet advertising for immigration to Western Canada, c. 1910

Population growth in the Northwest Territories, and then the Western provinces, picked up when the Canadian government passed the Dominion Lands Act in 1872 to encourage the settlement of the Canadian Prairies, and to help prevent the area from being claimed by the United States. The act gave a claimant 160 acres (65 ha) for free, the only cost to the farmer being a $10 administration fee. Any male farmer who was at least 21 years of age and agreed to cultivate at least 40 acres (16 ha) of the land and build a permanent dwelling on it (within three years) qualified. The population of the Canadian prairies grew rapidly in the last decade of the 19th century, and the population of Saskatchewan more than quintupled from 91,000 in 1901 to 492,000 in 1911. The vast majority of these people were immigrants from Europe.

Early counts of Northwest Territories' population tend to exclude the Indigenous peoples living within it, such as the Dene of Denendeh or Inuit of Inuit Nunangat. The territory's population drops at the turn of the 20th and 21st centuries are due to its reduction in size, as Yukon, then Saskatchewan and Alberta were carved out of its territory, and the same with Nunavut a century later. Yukon's population spike at the turn of the 20th century is due to the Klondike Gold Rush, when an estimated 100,000 people tried to reach the Klondike goldfields between 1896 and 1899, of whom only around 30,000 to 40,000 eventually did.

Generally, provinces steadily grew in population along with Canada. However, some provinces experienced long periods of stagnation or population decline. After peaking in 1891, Prince Edward Island's population started to decline every year until 1941, after which the province started growing again. In Saskatchewan, after a rapid population explosion at the beginning of the century that propelled the province to being the third largest in the country, its population declined during the Great Depression, and its growth had been slow ever since. From 1931 to 2016, Saskatchewan's population increased by only 19.2 percent, well below the national average. Newfoundland and Labrador, on the other hand, experienced slow but continuous growth until the 1990s, when the cod fisheries collapsed, and their population started to fall.

After the collapse of the Canadian birth rate, most provinces now sustain their population with immigration from the developing world. The number of new immigrants increases every year.

=== Demographic weight of provinces and territories ===
Breakdown of Canada's population from the 2016 census by province/territory

The demographic weight of each province in Canada has always constituted a sensitive issue. In 1840, the Durham Report recommended that Upper Canada (now Ontario) and Lower Canada (now Quebec) be united into one province. The newly created Legislative Assembly of the Province of Canada was required to have equal representation from Canada East (now Quebec) and Canada West (now Ontario), even though the population of Canada East was considerably larger. In 1840, the population of Canada East was estimated at 670,000, while the population of Canada West was estimated to be 480,000. Lord Durham had not recommended this approach and had instead proposed that the representation should be based on the respective populations of the two regions. The British government rejected that recommendation and instead implemented sectional equality, apparently to give the English-speaking population of the new province a dominant voice in the provincial government.

However, the 1851 census revealed that Canada West's population had surpassed Canada East's. This fact fuelled demands in Canada West for the end of sectional equality and the move toward allocating seats in the legislature on the basis of population, nicknamed "rep by pop". This was a hotly contested issue at the constitutional conferences leading up to confederation, and the colonies reached a compromise in which the seats in the federal lower house (House of Commons) would be allocated by population, and the seats in the federal upper house (Senate) would be allocated on the basis of three defined regions – Ontario, Quebec and the Maritimes – that would each have 24 seats.

Since Confederation, Ontario and Quebec have always been Canada's two most populous provinces. However, their combined demographic weight decreased from over 80 percent at Confederation to just over 60 percent in 2016. The Atlantic provinces also lost importance within Canada, from around 20 percent at Confederation to under 7 percent today. The West's importance, however, has only increased, from insignificant levels in 1871 to over 30 percent of the country in 2016. In the first half of the 20th century, the most populous western province was Saskatchewan, but its population was later eclipsed by British Columbia, Alberta, and Manitoba.

Bump chart showing the relative population rank of each Canadian province since Confederation (1867).

The issue of the demographic weight of each province came up during the negotiations for the patriation of the Canadian Constitution, and especially discussions around the amending formula of the Constitution. The final formula stipulates that most changes to the Constitution must be approved by the House of Commons and the Senate, as well as the legislative assemblies of seven provinces representing at least 50 per cent of the Canadian population. This means that either Ontario or Quebec have to agree to any constitutional amendments that affect all provinces, as the other eight provinces combined have less than half of the national population.

Quebec had managed to maintain a stable demographic weight within Canada during the first half of the 20th century due to its high birth rate. However, their importance began to slip as their birth rate started to fall in the 1960s. Quebec wanted to make it up through immigration, and for this purpose created its Ministry of Immigration in 1968, and negotiated for increased powers in this field with the federal government. However, new immigrants to Canada disproportionally go to Ontario, British Columbia, and Alberta, fuelling their rise in demographic weight. In response, a Canada–Québec Accord was concluded in 1991 which, among other things, guaranteed Quebec an immigration rate proportional to its demographic weight in Canada. This provision was not fulfilled, as in 2005, immigration to Quebec represented only 16.5 percent of all immigration to Canada.

Quebec also attempted to maintain its weight within the Canadian House of Commons during the constitutional negotiations of the early 1990s. Under the Charlottetown Accord, in exchange for Quebec losing Senate seats under a Triple-E Senate (dropping from 24 to 6), Quebec was guaranteed never to be allotted less than 25 percent of the seats in the House of Commons. The accord was ultimately defeated in a public referendum.

== See also ==
- Interprovincial migration in Canada
- List of Canadian provinces and territories by historical population
- List of largest Canadian cities by census
- List of the largest cities and towns in Canada by area
- List of the largest municipalities in Canada by population
- List of the largest population centres in Canada
- Population of Canada
