= Population of Canada =

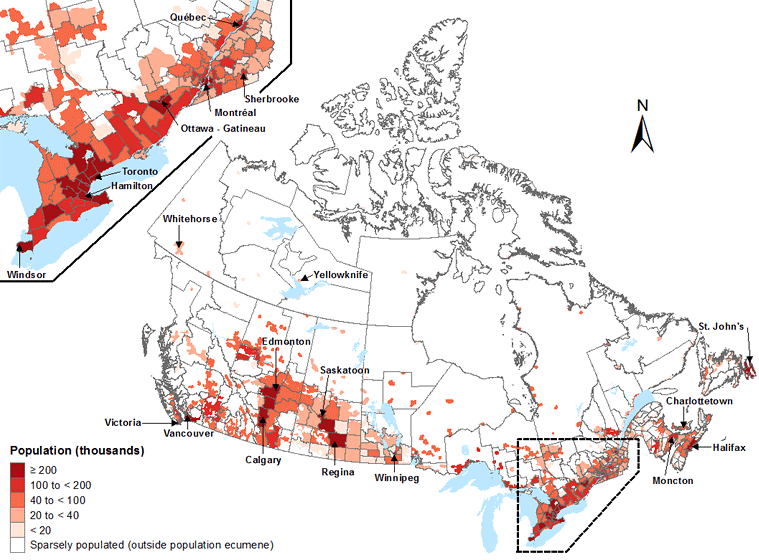
Canada population density map (2014) Top left: The Quebec City–Windsor Corridor is the most densely inhabited and heavily industrialized region accounting for nearly 50 percent of the total population

Canada ranks 37th by population among countries of the world, comprising about 0.5% of the world's total, with about 41.5 million Canadians as of Q1 2026. Despite being the second-largest country by total area (fourth-largest by land area), the vast majority of the country is sparsely inhabited, with most of its population south of the 55th parallel north. Just over 60% of Canadians live in just two provinces: Ontario and Quebec. Though Canada's overall population density is low, many regions in the south, such as the Quebec City–Windsor Corridor, have population densities higher than several European countries. Canada has six population centres with more than one million people: Toronto, Montreal, Vancouver, Calgary, Edmonton and Ottawa.

The large size of Canada's north, which is currently not arable, and thus cannot support large human populations, significantly lowers the country's carrying capacity relative to its size. In 2021, the population density of Canada was 4.2 people per square kilometre.

The historical growth of Canada's population is complex and has been influenced in many different ways, such as Indigenous populations, expansion of territory, and human migration. Immigration has been, and remains, the most important factor in Canada's population growth. The 2021 Canadian census counted a total population of 36,991,981, an increase of around 5.2 per cent over the 2016 figure. Between 1990 and 2008, the population increased by 5.6 million, equivalent to 20.4 per cent overall growth.

In 2026, the country has experienced a population decline for the first time since the country was formed, from 41.6 million in Q1 2025 to 41.5 million in Q1 2026. The decrease in population has been attributed to a reduction in the number of non-permanent residents.

== Historical population overview ==
=== Indigenous peoples ===
A map of Canada showing the percent of self-reported Indigenous identity (First Nations, Inuit, Métis) by census division, according to the 2021 Canadian census

A variety of estimations have been postulated for the Indigenous population in what is now Canada prior to European contact. Estimates of this population during the late 15th century range between 200,000 and two million, with a figure of 500,000 currently accepted by Canada's Royal Commission on Aboriginal Peoples. Although not without conflict, European Canadians' early interactions with First Nations and Inuit populations were relatively peaceful. However repeated outbreaks of European infectious diseases such as influenza, measles and smallpox (to which they had no natural immunity), combined with other effects of European contact, resulted in a twenty-five per cent to eighty per cent Indigenous population decrease post-contact. Roland G Robertson suggests that during the late 1630s, smallpox killed over half of the Wendat (Huron), who controlled most of the early North American fur trade in the area of New France. In 1822 the Indigenous Canadian population, excluding the Métis, was estimated as 283,500 people. In 1871, there was an enumeration of the Indigenous population within the limits of Canada at the time, showing a total of only 102,358 individuals. In 1885 the number of Indigenous people in Canada was reported as 131,952 individuals. From 2006 to 2016, the Indigenous population has grown by 42.5 per cent, four times the national rate. The Indigenous population representing 5 percent or 1.8 million individuals, grew by 9.4 percent compared to the non-Indigenous population, which grew by 5.3 percent from 2016 to 2021. The 2021 Census data reveals that there are over 1.8 million Indigenous people in Canada, comprising 5.0% of the overall Canadian population, a slight increase from 4.9% in 2016.

=== New France ===
The European population grew slowly under French rule, thus remained relatively low as growth was largely achieved through natural births, rather than by immigration. Most of the French were farmers, and the rate of natural increase among the settlers themselves was very high. The women had about 30 per cent more children than comparable women who remained in France. Demographer Yves Landry says, "Canadians had an exceptional diet for their time." The 1666 census of New France was the first census conducted in North America. It was organized by Jean Talon, the first Intendant of New France, between 1665 and 1666. According to Talon's census there were 3,215 people in New France, comprising 538 separate families. The census showed a great difference in the number of men at 2,034 versus 1,181 women. By the early 1700s the New France settlers were well established along the Saint Lawrence River and Acadian Peninsula with a population around 15,000 to 16,000. Mainly due to natural increase and modest immigration from Northwest France (Brittany, Normandy, Île-de-France, Poitou-Charentes and Pays de la Loire) the population of New France increased to 55,000 according to the last French census of 1754. This was an increase from 42,701 in 1730.

=== British Canada ===
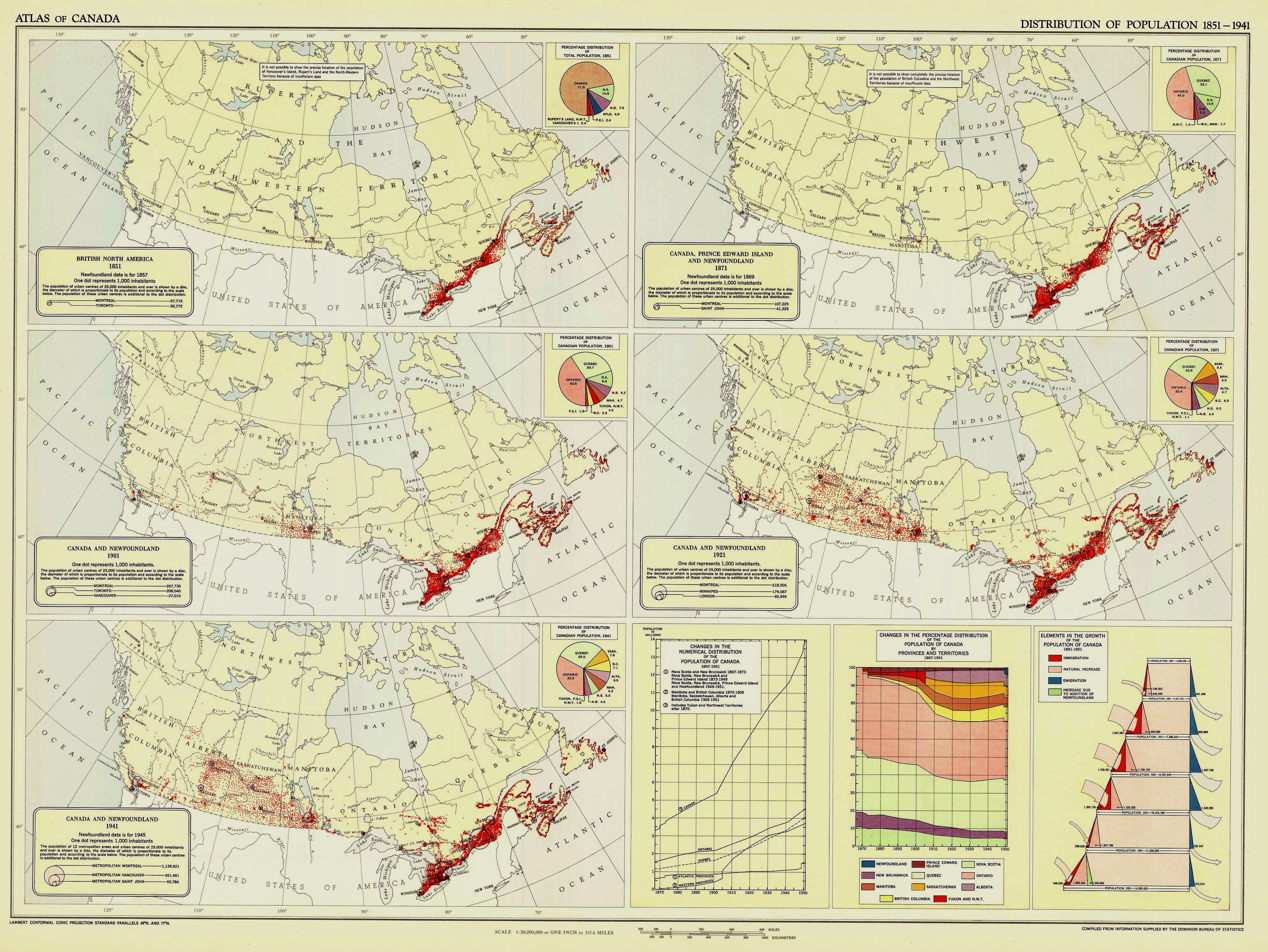
Distribution of the population in Canada for the years 1851, 1871, 1901, 1921 and 1941

During the late 18th and early 19th century Canada under British rule experienced strong population growth. In the wake of the 1775 invasion of Canada by the newly formed Continental Army during the American Revolutionary War, approximately 60,000 of the 80,000 Americans loyal to the Crown, designated later as United Empire Loyalists fled to British North America, a large portion of whom migrated to Nova Scotia and New Brunswick (separated from Nova Scotia) in 1784. Although the exact numbers cannot be certain because of unregistered migration At least 20,000 went to Nova Scotia, 14,000 to New Brunswick; 1,500 to PEI and 6,000 to Ontario(13,000 including 5,000 blacks went to England and 5,500 to the Caribbean). For the rest of the 1780s additional immigrants arrived from the south. From 1791 An additional 30,000 Americans, called "Late Loyalists", were lured into Ontario in the 1790s by the promise of land and swearing loyalty to the Crown. As a result of the period known as the Great Migration by 1831, Lower Canada's population had reached approximately 553,000, with Upper Canada reaching about 237,000 individuals. The Great Famine of Ireland of the 1840s had significantly increased the pace of Irish immigration to Prince Edward Island and the Province of Canada, peaking in 1847 with 100,000 distressed individuals. By 1851, the population of the Maritime colonies also reached roughly 533,000 (277,000 in Nova Scotia, 194,000 in New Brunswick and 62,000 in Prince Edward Island). To the west British Columbia had about 55,000 individuals by 1851. Beginning in the late 1850s, the immigration of Chinese into the Colony of Vancouver Island and Colony of British Columbia peaked with the onset of the Fraser Canyon Gold Rush. By 1861, as a result of natural births and the Great Migration of Canada from the British Isles, the Province of Canada population increased to 3.1 million inhabitants. Newfoundland's population by 1861 reached approximately 125,000 individuals.

=== Post-confederation ===
The population has increased every year since the establishment of the Dominion of Canada in 1867; however, the population of Newfoundland was not included prior to its entry into confederation as Canada's tenth province in 1949. The first national census of the country was taken in 1871, with a population count around 3,689,000. The year with the least population growth (in real terms) was 1882–1883, when only 30,000 new individuals were enumerated.

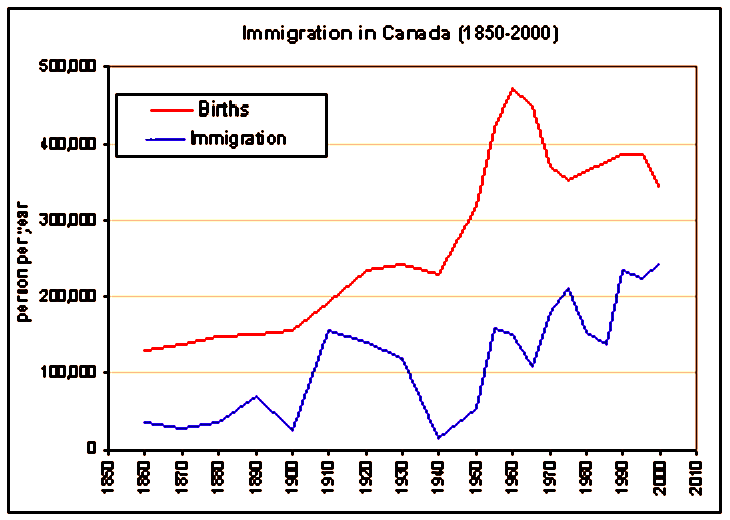
Births and immigration in Canada from 1850 to 2000

The 1911 census was a detailed enumeration of the population showing a count of 7,206,643 individuals. This was an increase of 34% over the 1901 census of 5,371,315. The year with the most population growth was during the peak of the Post-World War II baby boom in 1956–1957, when the population grew by over 529,000, in a single twelve-month period. The Canadian baby boom, defined as the period from 1947 to 1966, saw more than 400,000 babies born annually. The 1996 census recorded a total population of 28,846,761. This was a 5.7% increase over the 1991 census of 27,296,859. The 2001 census had a total population count of 30,007,094. In contrast, the official Statistics Canada population estimate for 2001 was 31,021,300.

Canada's total population enumerated by the 2006 census was 31,612,897. This count was lower than the official 1 July 2006 population estimate of 32,623,490 people. Ninety per cent of the population growth between 2001 and 2006 was concentrated in the main metropolitan areas. The 2011 census was the fifteenth decennial census with a total population count of 33,476,688, up 5.9% from 2006. On average, censuses have been taken every five years since 1905. Censuses are required to be taken at least every ten years as mandated in section 8 of the Constitution Act, 1867.

== Components of population growth ==
A population estimate for 2022 put the total number of people in Canada at 38,232,593.

Demographic statistics according to the World Population Review in 2022.

- One birth every 1 minute
- One death every 2 minutes
- One net migrant every 2 minutes
- Net gain of one person every 2 minutes

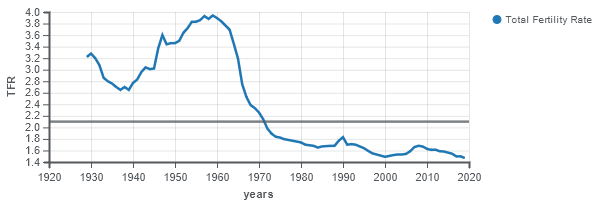
Canada's fertility rate from 1929 to 2019. The rate fell below two in the 1970s.

In 2010, Canada's annual population growth rate was 1.238%, or a daily increase of 1,137 individuals. Between 1867 and 2009 Canada's population grew by 979%. Canada had the highest net migration rate (0.61%) of all G-8 member countries between 1994 and 2004. Natural growth accounts for an annual increase of 137,626 persons, at a yearly rate of 0.413%. Between 2001 and 2006, there were 1,446,080 immigrants and 237,418 emigrants, resulting in a net migration of just over 1.2 million people. Since 2001 until 2010, immigration has ranged between 221,352 and 262,236 immigrants per annum.

In 2023, Canada's population jumped by over 1 million people for the first time in the country's history. The population growth was largely fuelled by migrants who were brought to the country to ease labour shortages. In 2026, Canada's population declined for the first time since Confederation, with a reduction in non-permanent residents declining from 3.1 million in Q4 2024 to 2.6 million in Q1 2026. As of March 2026, the estimated population of Canada is 41,472,081 people.

== Population by years ==
Prior to Canadian Confederation in 1867 the population counts reflected only the former colonies and settlements and not the country to be as a whole with Indigenous nations separated.

=== Ephemeral European settlements ===
Year	Area/colony	Population	Notes
1000	L'Anse aux Meadows (Newfoundland)	30 to 160	Archaeological evidence of a short-lived Norse settlement was found at L'Anse aux Meadows, on the northernmost tip of the island of Newfoundland (carbon dating estimate 990–1050 AD.) There is no record of how many men and women lived at the site at any given time, however archaeological evidence of the dwellings suggest it had the capacity of supporting 30 to 160 individuals.
1541	Cap-Rouge (Quebec City)	400	Jacques Cartier established Charlesbourg-Royal at Cap-Rouge on his third voyage. Even though scurvy was cured through the Indigenous remedy (Thuja occidentalis infusion), the impression left is of a general misery with the effort being abandoned. During the winter 35 of Cartier's men perished.
1543	Cap-Rouge (Quebec City)	200	In 1542, Jean-François Roberval tried to re-invigorate the Charlesbourg-Royal colony at Cap-Rouge which Roberval renamed France-Roy, however after a set of disastrous winters the effort was abandoned. En route to Charlesbourg-Royal, Roberval had abandoned his near-relative Marguerite de La Rocque with her lover on the "Isle of Demons" (now called Harrington Island), in the Gulf of Saint Lawrence, as punishment for their affair. The young man, their servant and baby died, but Marguerite survived to be rescued by fishermen and returned to France two years later.
1583	St. John Bay (Newfoundland)	260	Humphrey Gilbert with 260 men planned a settlement; however, during exploration of the coast line a ship was lost containing many of the prospective colonists and their provisions.
1598	Sable Island (Nova Scotia)	50	Marquis de La Roche-Mesgouez and 40 convicts (peasants and beggars) with 10 soldiers settled on Sable Island, but this colonization attempt failed, culminating in a revolt with only 11 survivors evacuated.
1600	Tadoussac (Quebec)	16	François Gravé Du Pont with 16 men built a fur trading post at Tadoussac; however, only five of the men survived the winter before returning to France.
1604	Saint Croix (Maine)	79	The St. Croix settlement of Maine was the first real attempt at a year-round base of operation in New France. The expedition was led by Pierre Du Gua de Monts with 79 settlers including François Gravé Du Pont, Royal cartographer Samuel de Champlain, the Baron de Poutrincourt, apothecary Louis Hébert, a priest Nicolas Aubry, and Mathieu de Costa a linguist. The St. Croix settlement was abandoned the following summer for a new habitation at Port-Royal after 35 died of scurvy.

=== Former colonies and territories ===
The first in date of the Colonies which became successful, and which consequently marked the starting point of European settlements on what would be Canada, was the foundation of Port Royal, Acadia. List of censuses.

Year	Area/colony	Population	Notes
1605	Port Royal (Nova Scotia)	44	The 44 colonists are surviving members of 79 from the now abandoned St. Croix settlement of Maine. However, the habitation at Port-Royal was also abandoned and left in the care of the local Mi'kmaq. The settlement was later moved upstream and to the south bank of the Annapolis River, keeping the name Port-Royal and becoming the capital of Acadia.
1608	Quebec City	28	Samuel de Champlain establishes the colony with 28 settlers. Half of the men that winter the first year die of scurvy or starvation. Nevertheless, new settlers arrive resulting in Quebec being the first permanent settlement, and also the capital of, the French colony of Canada.
1610	Cuper's Cove (Newfoundland)	40	The Newfoundland Colony is established by John Guy his brother Phillip and his brother-in-law William Colston with 39 colonists who spend the winter of 1610–1611 at Cuper's Cove. By the fall of 1613 sixteen structures are completed by about 60 settlers on the site. As England tried to create a foothold in the north, other settlements were established at Bristol's Hope, Renews, New Cambriol, South Falkland and Avalon, an area that became known as the English Shore. However the majority of the population did not stay year round returning in the spring of each year. Over the next 100 years the English colonies of Newfoundland grew very slowly, and had only 3,000 permanent residents by the 1720s.
1629	Quebec City	117	*90 wintering belonged to Kirke's English Expedition that had captured the city. Under brief British control the city begins to grow and be fortified. Prior to 1632 only eight births were recorded among the 60 to 70 permanent European settlers. The first European child born in Quebec had been Hélène Desportes, in 1620.
1641	New France	240	De facto population of Canada (New France) and Acadia, now situated partly in the future United States.
1642	Fort Ville-Marie (Old Montreal)	50	New colony with the majority of immigrants coming directly from France led by Paul de Chomedey and Jeanne Mance, a lay woman.
1666	Canada (New France)	3,215	The 1660s marked the only real "wave" of French settlers arriving until the Treaty of Utrecht in 1713. Following the initial wave of French settlers natural growth was the main contributing factor to population growth. Quebec city 2,100, Trois-Rivières 455, Montreal 655. (Comprising 528 families with 2,034 men and 1,181 women. Professionals included 3 notaries, 3 schoolmasters, 3 locksmiths, 4 bailiffs, 5 surgeons, 5 bakers, 8 barrel makers, 9 millers, 18 official merchants, 27 joiners, and 36 carpenters.)
1677	Indigenous; Nations	10,750	Estimated Indigenous population in and around New France territory 10,750, including 2,150 warriors. (Mohawks 5 villages, 96 lodges, 300 warriors – Oneidas 1 village, 100 lodges, 200 warriors – Onondagas 2 villages, 164 lodges, 350 warriors – Cayugas 3 villages, 100 lodges, 300 warriors – Senecas 4 villages, 324 lodges, 1,000 warriors).
1679	Acadia	515	Majority are from La Rochelle, the Poitou and Saintonge regions of France.
1681	New France	9,677	New France sees new settlements develop as residents leave Quebec City (population 1,345) and Trois-Rivières (150) with Montreal gaining influence (population 1,418).
1687	Newfoundland	663	French population only.
1695	New France	13,639	Population of Saint John River New Brunswick 49.
1698	New France	15,355	English population of Newfoundland at the time 1,500.

==== 18th century ====
Year	Area/colony	Population	Notes
1705	Newfoundland	520	French population only
1706	New France	16,417	Covering territory that is now situated partly in the United States of America and partly in Canada.
1712	New France	18,440	Married – men 2,786, women 2,588. Unmarried – males 6,716, females 6,350.
1718	New France	22,983	Married – men 3,662, women 3,926. Unmarried – males 7,911, females 7,484.
1720	St.John Island (Prince Edward Island)	100	17 families
1730	New France	33,682	Married – men 6,050, women 5,728. Unmarried – males 11,314, females 10,590.
1736	Indigenous; Nations	17,575	Estimated population of First Nations in New France that are now within Canada – Abenakis 2,950 – Algonquins, Ottawas, Potawatomi, Saulteaux and Crees 11,475 – Wendat-Huron 1,300 – Iroquois 1,850.
1737	New France	39,970	Married – men 7,378, women 6,804. Unmarried – males 13,330, females 12,458.
1741	Newfoundland	6,000	English population only.
1749	Nova Scotia	2,544	Married – men, 509; women 509. Unmarried – men, 660; women, 3. Children-boys, 228; girls, 216. Servants-men, 277; women, 142.
1749	Île-Royale (Cape Breton)	1,000	French population only.
1749	Acadian Mainland (New Brunswick)	1,000	French population only.
1749	Acadian Peninsula	13,000	French population only.
1749	St. John Island (Prince Edward Island)	1,000	French population only.
1752	Acadia (non-French)	4,203	British and German population only. Men over sixteen years old, 574; women over sixteen years old, 607. Children boys, 1,899; children girls, 1,123.
1760	New France	70,000	Expulsion of the Acadians three-quarters of the Acadian population of 18,000 forcibly relocated between 1755 and 1764.
1765	Province of Quebec (1763–91)	69,810	French and English populations.
1775	Province of Quebec (1763–91)	90,000	French and English populations.
1785	Newfoundland	10,244	French and English populations.
1790	Nova Scotia	30,000	French and English populations.
1797	St. John Island (Prince Edward Island)	4,500	French and English populations.

==== 19th century ====
Year	Area/Province	Population
1806	New Brunswick	35,000
1806	Prince Edward Island	9,676
1806	Upper Canada	70,718
1806	Lower Canada	250,000
1806	Newfoundland	26,505
1807	Nova Scotia	65,000
1822	Prince Edward Island	24,600
1823	Newfoundland	52,157
1824	Upper Canada	150,066
1824	New Brunswick	74,176
1825	Upper Canada	157,923
1825	Lower Canada	479,288
1831	Lower Canada	553,134
1832	Upper Canada	263,554
1832	Newfoundland	59,280
1833	Prince Edward Island	32,292
1844	Canada East	697,084
1845	Newfoundland	96,295
1846	Assiniboia (North-West Territories)	4,871
1848	Canada West	725,879
1861	Colony of Vancouver Island	3,024
1869	Newfoundland	146,536
1871	British Columbia	36,247
1871	Manitoba	25,228
1871	Ontario	1,620,851
1871	Quebec	1,191,516
1871	New Brunswick	285,594
1871	Nova Scotia	387,800
1871	Prince Edward Island	94,021
1871	Northwest Territories	48,000

Year	Canada as a whole	Population	Provinces/Area
1822	Indigenous population	283,500	British North America 283,500
1871	Indigenous population	102,358	Prince Edward Island 323 – Nova Scotia 1,666 – New Brunswick 1,403 – Quebec 6,988 – Ontario 12,978 – British Columbia 23,000 – Rupert's Land 33,500 – Manitoba 500 and Labrador and the Arctic Watersheds 22,000
1885	Indigenous population	131,952	Prince Edward Island 292 - Nova Scotia 2,197 - New Brunswick 1,524 - Quebec 12,023 - Ontario 16,892 - British Columbia 39,011 - Eastern Rupert's Land 4,016 - Manitoba and Northwest Territories 33,959 - Peace River district 2,038 - Athabaska district 8,000 - McKenzie district 7,000 - Labrador (Canadian interior) 1,000 - Arctic coast 4,000

=== Canada as a whole since confederation ===
Historical population
Year	Pop.	±%
1867	3,463,000	—
1868	3,511,000	+1.4%
1869	3,565,000	+1.5%
1870	3,625,000	+1.7%
1871	3,689,000	+1.8%
1872	3,755,000	+1.8%
1873	3,826,000	+1.9%
1874	3,895,000	+1.8%
1875	3,954,000	+1.5%
1876	4,009,000	+1.4%
1877	4,064,000	+1.4%
1878	4,121,000	+1.4%
1879	4,186,000	+1.6%
1880	4,255,000	+1.6%
1881	4,325,000	+1.6%
1882	4,400,000	+1.7%
1883	4,430,000	+0.7%
1884	4,487,000	+1.3%
1885	4,537,000	+1.1%
1886	4,580,000	+0.9%
1887	4,626,000	+1.0%
1888	4,678,000	+1.1%
1889	4,729,000	+1.1%
1890	4,779,000	+1.1%
1891	4,831,000	+1.1%
1892	4,883,000	+1.1%
1893	4,931,000	+1.0%
1894	4,979,000	+1.0%
1895	5,026,000	+0.9%
1896	5,074,000	+1.0%
1897	5,122,000	+0.9%
1898	5,175,000	+1.0%
1899	5,235,000	+1.2%
1900	5,310,000	+1.4%
1901	5,371,000	+1.1%
1902	5,494,000	+2.3%
1903	5,651,000	+2.9%
1904	5,827,000	+3.1%
1905	6,002,000	+3.0%
1906	6,097,000	+1.6%
1907	6,411,000	+5.2%
1908	6,625,000	+3.3%
1909	6,700,000	+1.1%
1910	6,988,000	+4.3%
1911	7,207,000	+3.1%
1912	7,389,000	+2.5%
1913	7,632,000	+3.3%
1914	7,879,000	+3.2%
1915	7,981,000	+1.3%
1916	8,001,000	+0.3%
1917	8,060,000	+0.7%
1918	8,148,000	+1.1%
1919	8,311,000	+2.0%
1920	8,435,000	+1.5%
1921	8,788,000	+4.2%
1922	8,919,000	+1.5%

Historical population
Year	Pop.	±%
1922	8,919,000	—
1923	9,010,000	+1.0%
1924	9,143,000	+1.5%
1925	9,294,000	+1.7%
1926	9,451,000	+1.7%
1927	9,637,000	+2.0%
1928	9,835,000	+2.1%
1929	10,029,000	+2.0%
1930	10,208,000	+1.8%
1931	10,377,000	+1.7%
1932	10,510,000	+1.3%
1933	10,633,000	+1.2%
1934	10,741,000	+1.0%
1935	10,845,000	+1.0%
1936	10,950,000	+1.0%
1937	11,045,000	+0.9%
1938	11,152,000	+1.0%
1939	11,267,000	+1.0%
1940	11,382,000	+1.0%
1941	11,507,000	+1.1%
1942	11,654,000	+1.3%
1943	11,795,000	+1.2%
1944	11,946,000	+1.3%
1945	12,072,000	+1.1%
1946	12,292,000	+1.8%
1947	12,551,000	+2.1%
1948	12,823,000	+2.2%
1949	13,447,000	+4.9%
1950	13,712,000	+2.0%
1951	14,009,000	+2.2%
1952	14,459,000	+3.2%
1953	14,845,000	+2.7%
1954	15,287,000	+3.0%
1955	15,698,000	+2.7%
1956	16,081,000	+2.4%
1957	16,610,000	+3.3%
1958	17,080,000	+2.8%
1959	17,483,000	+2.4%
1960	17,870,000	+2.2%
1961	18,239,000	+2.1%
1962	18,583,000	+1.9%
1963	18,931,000	+1.9%
1964	19,291,000	+1.9%
1965	19,644,000	+1.8%
1966	19,967,000	+1.6%
1967	20,500,000	+2.7%
1968	20,701,000	+1.0%
1969	21,001,000	+1.4%
1970	21,297,000	+1.4%
1971	21,963,000	+3.1%
1972	22,219,000	+1.2%
1973	22,494,000	+1.2%
1974	22,809,000	+1.4%
1975	23,143,000	+1.5%

Historical population
Year	Pop.	±%
1975	23,143,000	—
1976	23,449,000	+1.3%
1977	23,727,000	+1.2%
1978	23,964,000	+1.0%
1979	24,203,000	+1.0%
1980	24,517,000	+1.3%
1981	24,821,000	+1.2%
1982	25,118,000	+1.2%
1983	25,367,000	+1.0%
1984	25,608,000	+1.0%
1985	25,843,000	+0.9%
1986	26,101,000	+1.0%
1987	26,449,000	+1.3%
1988	26,798,000	+1.3%
1989	27,056,000	+1.0%
1990	27,512,000	+1.7%
1991	27,945,000	+1.6%
1992	28,377,000	+1.5%
1993	28,682,000	+1.1%
1994	28,997,000	+1.1%
1995	29,302,000	+1.1%
1996	29,610,000	+1.1%
1997	29,906,000	+1.0%
1998	30,155,000	+0.8%
1999	30,401,000	+0.8%
2000	30,686,000	+0.9%
2001	31,021,000	+1.1%
2002	31,360,000	+1.1%
2003	31,644,000	+0.9%
2004	31,941,000	+0.9%
2005	32,244,000	+0.9%
2006	32,571,000	+1.0%
2007	32,889,000	+1.0%
2008	33,247,000	+1.1%
2009	33,629,000	+1.1%
2010	34,006,000	+1.1%
2011	34,339,000	+1.0%
2012	34,713,000	+1.1%
2013	35,081,000	+1.1%
2014	35,434,000	+1.0%
2015	35,704,000	+0.8%
2016	36,111,000	+1.1%
2017	36,545,000	+1.2%
2018	37,073,000	+1.4%
2019	37,618,000	+1.5%
2020	38,029,000	+1.1%
2021	38,240,000	+0.6%
2022	38,950,000	+1.9%
2023	40,049,000	+2.8%
2024	41,262,000	+3.0%
2025	41,652,000	+0.9%

== Census data by years ==
Indigenous Population History in Canada
Year	Pop.	±%
1822	283,500	—
1871	102,358	−63.9%
1881	108,547	+6.0%
1885	131,952	+21.6%
1901	147,941	+12.1%
1911	105,611	−28.6%
1921	114,083	+8.0%
1931	128,899	+13.0%
1941	160,937	+24.9%
1951	165,607	+2.9%
1961	220,121	+32.9%
1971	312,765	+42.1%
1981	491,460	+57.1%
1986	711,725	+44.8%
1991	1,016,340	+42.8%
1996	799,010	−21.4%
2001	976,305	+22.2%
2006	1,172,790	+20.1%
2011	1,400,690	+19.4%
2016	1,673,785	+19.5%
2021	1,807,250	+8.0%
Source: Statistics Canada Note: Population decline between 1991 and 1996 censuses attributed to change in criteria in census count; "the 1996 Royal Commission on Aboriginal Peoples used a more restrictive definition of Aboriginal".

Historical population
Year	Pop.	±%
1871	3,689,257	—
1881	4,324,810	+17.2%
1891	4,833,239	+11.8%
1901	5,371,315	+11.1%
1911	7,206,643	+34.2%
1921	8,787,949	+21.9%
1931	10,374,196	+18.1%
1941	11,506,655	+10.9%
1951	14,009,429	+21.8%
1961	18,238,247	+30.2%
1971	21,568,311	+18.3%
1976	22,992,604	+6.6%
1981	24,343,181	+5.9%
1986	25,309,331	+4.0%
1991	27,296,859	+7.9%
1996	28,846,761	+5.7%
2001	30,007,094	+4.0%
2006	31,612,897	+5.4%
2011	33,476,688	+5.9%
2016	35,151,728	+5.0%
2021	36,991,981	+5.2%

== Data projections ==
In 2006, Statistics Canada projected for the decade 2021 to 2031 the population to grow by more than 5 million, or more than 10%. Between 1990 and 2008, the population increased by 5.6 million, equivalent to 20.4 per cent overall growth. The 2016 Canadian census counted a total population of 35.1 million, or 1.5 million under the 2006 projection.

In October 2020, the Trudeau government announced its plans to bring in more than 1.2 million immigrants over the subsequent three years, to catch up to the high-growth scenario.

Population projections High-growth scenario
Year	Pop.	±%
2011	33,470,000	—
2016	36,540,000	+9.2%
2021	39,110,000	+7.0%
2026	41,750,000	+6.8%
2031	44,430,000	+6.4%
2036	47,130,000	+6.1%
2041	49,900,000	+5.9%
2046	52,910,000	+6.0%
2051	56,070,000	+6.0%
2056	59,400,000	+5.9%
2061	63,000,000	+6.1%

== Modern population distribution ==
Population density of Canadian provinces and territories, 2021 >25 people/km^{2} 15-24.9 people/km^{2} 10-14.9 people/km^{2} 5-9.9 people/km^{2} 1-4.9 people/km^{2} <1 people/km^{2}

=== By province and territory ===
- List of population centres in Alberta
- List of population centres in British Columbia
- List of population centres in Manitoba
- List of population centres in New Brunswick
- List of population centres in Newfoundland and Labrador
- List of population centres in the Northwest Territories
- List of population centres in Nova Scotia
- List of population centres in Nunavut
- List of population centres in Ontario
- List of population centres in Prince Edward Island
- List of population centres in Quebec
- List of population centres in Saskatchewan
- List of population centres in Yukon

=== By cities and municipalities ===
- List of largest Canadian cities by census
- List of the largest municipalities in Canada by population

=== First Nations ===
- List of Indian reserves in Canada by population

== See also ==
- Demographics of Canada
- Canada immigration statistics
- Annual immigration statistics of Canada
- Immigration to Canada
- Interprovincial migration in Canada
- List of Canadian provinces and territories by Human Development Index
