= List of the largest municipalities in Canada by population =

Canadian municipalities ranked by number of inhabitants

The table below lists the 100 largest census subdivisions (municipalities or municipal equivalents) in Canada by population, using data from the 2021 Canadian census for census subdivisions.

This list includes only the population within a census subdivision's boundaries as defined at the time of the census. Many census subdivisions are part of a larger census metropolitan area or census agglomeration. For their ranking, see the list of census metropolitan areas and agglomerations in Canada.

A city is displayed in bold if it is a provincial or federal capital (Ottawa). An italicized city is the largest in its province. Three territories (Yukon, Northwest Territories, Nunavut) and one province (Prince Edward Island) do not have municipalities among the 100 most populous in Canada.

Rank (2021)	Municipality	Province	Municipal status	Population (2021)	Population (2016)	Change	Land area (km^{2})	Population density (/km^{2})
1	**Toronto**	Ontario	City	2,794,356	2,731,571	+2.3%	631.1	4,427.8
2	Montreal	Quebec	Ville	1,762,949	1,704,694	+3.4%	364.74	4,833.4
3	Calgary	Alberta	City	1,306,784	1,239,220	+5.5%	820.62	1,592.4
4	**Ottawa**	Ontario	City	1,017,449	934,243	+8.9%	2788.2	364.9
5	**Edmonton**	Alberta	City	1,010,899	933,088	+8.3%	765.61	1,320.4
6	**Winnipeg**	Manitoba	City	749,607	705,244	+6.3%	461.78	1,623.3
7	Mississauga	Ontario	City	717,961	721,599	−0.5%	292.74	2,452.6
8	Vancouver	British Columbia	City	662,248	631,486	+4.9%	115.18	5,749.7
9	Brampton	Ontario	City	656,480	593,638	+10.6%	265.89	2,469.0
10	Hamilton	Ontario	City	569,353	536,917	+6.0%	1118.31	509.1
11	Surrey	British Columbia	City	568,322	517,887	+9.7%	316.11	1,797.9
12	**Quebec City**	Quebec	Ville	549,459	531,902	+3.3%	452.30	1,214.8
13	**Halifax**	Nova Scotia	Regional municipality	439,819	403,131	+9.1%	5475.57	80.3
14	Laval	Quebec	Ville	438,366	422,993	+3.6%	246.13	1,781.0
15	London	Ontario	City	422,324	383,822	+10.0%	420.5	1,004.3
16	Markham	Ontario	City	338,503	328,966	+2.9%	210.93	1,604.8
17	Vaughan	Ontario	City	323,103	306,233	+5.5%	272.44	1,186.0
18	Gatineau	Quebec	Ville	291,041	276,245	+5.4%	341.84	851.4
19	Saskatoon	Saskatchewan	City	266,141	247,201	+7.7%	226.56	1,174.7
20	Kitchener	Ontario	City	256,885	233,222	+10.1%	136.81	1,877.7
21	Longueuil	Quebec	Ville	254,483	239,897	+6.1%	115.77	2,198.2
22	Burnaby	British Columbia	City	249,125	232,755	+7.0%	90.57	2,750.6
23	Windsor	Ontario	City	229,660	217,188	+5.7%	146.02	1,572.8
24	**Regina**	Saskatchewan	City	226,404	215,106	+5.3%	178.81	1,266.2
25	Oakville	Ontario	Town	213,759	193,832	+10.3%	138.94	1,538.5
26	Richmond	British Columbia	City	209,937	198,309	+5.9%	128.87	1,629.1
27	Richmond Hill	Ontario	City	202,022	195,022	+3.6%	100.79	2,004.4
28	Burlington	Ontario	City	186,948	183,314	+2.0%	186.12	1,004.4
29	Oshawa	Ontario	City	175,383	159,458	+10.0%	145.72	1,203.6
30	Sherbrooke	Quebec	Ville	172,950	161,531	+7.1%	353.40	489.4
31	Greater Sudbury	Ontario	City	166,004	161,531	+2.8%	3186.26	52.1
32	Abbotsford	British Columbia	City	153,524	141,397	+8.6%	375.33	409.0
33	Lévis	Quebec	Ville	149,683	143,414	+4.4%	448.07	334.1
34	Coquitlam	British Columbia	City	148,625	139,284	+6.7%	122.15	1,216.7
35	Barrie	Ontario	City	147,829	141,434	+4.5%	99.01	1,493.1
36	Saguenay	Quebec	Ville	144,723	145,949	−0.8%	1124.63	128.7
37	Kelowna	British Columbia	City	144,576	127,390	+13.5%	211.85	682.4
38	Guelph	Ontario	City	143,740	131,794	+9.1%	87.43	1,644.1
39	Trois-Rivières	Quebec	Ville	139,163	134,413	+3.5%	288.65	482.1
40	Whitby	Ontario	Town	138,501	128,377	+7.9%	146.69	944.2
41	Cambridge	Ontario	City	138,479	129,920	+6.6%	112.99	1,225.6
42	St. Catharines	Ontario	City	136,803	133,113	+2.8%	96.20	1,422.1
43	Milton	Ontario	Town	132,979	110,128	+20.7%	363.83	365.5
44	Langley	British Columbia	District municipality	132,603	117,285	+13.1%	307.22	431.6
45	Kingston	Ontario	City	132,485	123,798	+7.0%	451.58	293.4
46	Ajax	Ontario	Town	126,666	119,677	+5.8%	66.64	1,900.8
47	Waterloo	Ontario	City	121,436	104,986	+15.7%	64.06	1,895.7
48	Terrebonne	Quebec	Ville	119,944	111,575	+7.5%	153.76	780.1
49	Saanich	British Columbia	District municipality	117,735	114,148	+3.1%	103.59	1,136.5
50	**St. John's**	Newfoundland and Labrador	City	110,525	108,860	+1.5%	446.02	247.8
51	Thunder Bay	Ontario	City	108,843	107,909	+0.9%	327.77	332.1
52	Delta	British Columbia	City	108,455	102,238	+6.1%	179.66	603.7
53	Brantford	Ontario	City	104,688	98,563	+6.2%	98.65	1,061.2
54	Chatham-Kent	Ontario	Municipality	103,988	101,647	+2.3%	2451.90	42.4
55	Clarington	Ontario	Municipality	101,427	92,013	+10.2%	610.84	166.0
56	Red Deer	Alberta	City	100,844	100,418	+0.4%	104.34	966.5
57	Nanaimo	British Columbia	City	99,863	90,504	+10.3%	90.45	1,104.1
58	Strathcona County	Alberta	Specialized municipality	99,225	98,024	+1.2%	1170.65	84.8
59	Pickering	Ontario	City	99,186	91,771	+8.1%	231.10	429.2
60	Lethbridge	Alberta	City	98,406	92,729	+6.1%	121.12	812.5
61	Kamloops	British Columbia	City	97,902	90,280	+8.4%	297.93	328.6
62	Saint-Jean-sur-Richelieu	Quebec	Ville	97,873	95,114	+2.9%	226.93	431.3
63	Niagara Falls	Ontario	City	94,415	88,071	+7.2%	210.25	449.1
64	Cape Breton	Nova Scotia	Regional municipality	93,694	94,285	−0.6%	2419.70	38.7
65	Chilliwack	British Columbia	City	93,203	83,788	+11.2%	261.34	356.6
66	**Victoria**	British Columbia	City	91,867	85,792	+7.1%	19.45	4,723.2
67	Brossard	Quebec	Ville	91,525	85,721	+6.8%	45.19	2,025.3
68	Maple Ridge	British Columbia	City	90,990	82,256	+10.6%	267.82	339.7
69	North Vancouver	British Columbia	District municipality	88,168	85,649	+2.9%	160.66	548.8
70	Newmarket	Ontario	Town	87,942	84,224	+4.4%	38.50	2,284.2
71	Repentigny	Quebec	Ville	86,100	84,285	+2.2%	61.52	1,399.5
72	Peterborough	Ontario	City	83,651	81,032	+3.2%	64.76	1,291.7
73	Saint-Jérôme	Quebec	Ville	80,213	74,346	+7.9%	90.18	889.5
74	Moncton	New Brunswick	City	79,470	71,889	+10.5%	140.67	564.9
75	Drummondville	Quebec	Ville	79,258	75,423	+5.1%	247.11	320.7
76	Kawartha Lakes	Ontario	City	79,247	75,423	+5.1%	3033.66	26.1
77	New Westminster	British Columbia	City	78,916	70,996	+11.2%	15.62	5,052.2
78	Prince George	British Columbia	City	76,708	74,003	+3.7%	316.74	242.2
79	Caledon	Ontario	Town	76,581	66,502	+15.2%	688.82	111.2
80	Airdrie	Alberta	City	74,100	61,581	+20.3%	84.39	878.1
81	Wood Buffalo	Alberta	Specialized municipality	72,326	71,594	+1.0%	60843.88	1.2
82	Sault Ste. Marie	Ontario	City	72,051	73,368	−1.8%	221.99	324.6
83	Sarnia	Ontario	City	72,047	71,594	+0.6%	163.90	439.6
84	Saint John	New Brunswick	City	69,895	67,575	+3.4%	315.59	221.5
85	Granby	Quebec	Ville	69,025	66,222	+4.2%	152.69	452.1
86	St. Albert	Alberta	City	68,232	65,589	+4.0%	47.84	1,426.3
87	Norfolk County	Ontario	City	67,490	64,044	+5.4%	1597.68	42.2
88	Grande Prairie	Alberta	City	64,141	63,166	+1.5%	132.71	483.3
89	Medicine Hat	Alberta	City	63,271	63,260	0.0%	111.97	565.1
90	**Fredericton**	New Brunswick	City	63,116	58,721	+7.5%	133.93	471.3
91	Halton Hills	Ontario	Town	62,951	61,161	+2.9%	276.81	227.4
92	Aurora	Ontario	Town	62,057	55,445	+11.9%	50.00	1,241.1
93	Port Coquitlam	British Columbia	City	61,498	58,612	+4.9%	29.16	2,109.0
94	Mirabel	Quebec	City	61,108	50,513	+21.0%	484.09	126.2
95	Blainville	Quebec	Ville	59,819	56,863	+5.2%	54.97	1,088.2
96	North Vancouver	British Columbia	City	58,120	52,898	+9.9%	11.83	4,912.9
97	Saint-Hyacinthe	Quebec	Ville	57,239	55,648	+2.9%	188.85	303.1
98	Welland	Ontario	City	55,750	52,293	+6.6%	81.16	686.9
99	Belleville	Ontario	City	55,071	50,716	+8.6%	247.15	222.8
100	North Bay	Ontario	City	52,662	51,553	+2.2%	315.53	166.9

== See also ==
- List of the largest cities and towns in Canada by area
- List of the largest population centres in Canada
- List of largest Canadian cities by census
- List of census metropolitan areas and agglomerations in Canada
- Population of Canada by year
- Population of Canada by province and territory
