= List of population centres in Quebec =

Population centre, in Canadian census data, is a populated place, or a cluster of interrelated populated places, which meets the demographic characteristics of an urban area, having a population of at least 1,000 people and a population density of no fewer than 400 persons per square km^{2}. The boundaries of a populated place are not necessarily contiguous with municipal boundaries; a population centre may both include areas outside the boundaries of a municipality, if their urban development is directly contiguous, and may exclude areas inside the boundaries of a municipality which are less densely populated. A municipality may also not be classified as a population centre at all, but may simply be part of another municipality's population centre. Accordingly, do not confuse this list with List of municipalities in Quebec, which lists all municipalities by their actual municipal populations.

The term was first introduced in the Canada 2011 Census; prior to that, Statistics Canada used the term urban area.

In the 2021 Census of Population, Statistics Canada listed 273 population centres in the province of Quebec. Parts of two other population centres are adjacent to the provincial boundary with Ontario – the Gatineau portion of Ottawa-Gatineau and the Grenville portion Hawkesbury.

Rank	Population centre	Size group	Population (2021)	Population (2016)	Change	Land area (km^{2})	Population density
1	Montréal	Large urban	3,675,219	3,528,651	+4.2%	1,382.47	2,658.4/km^{2}
2	Québec	Large urban	733,156	708,280	+3.5%	442.85	1,655.5/km^{2}
−	Gatineau (Note: The Quebec part of the Ottawa-Gatineau population centre.)	Large urban	271,569	256,874	+5.7%	192.31	1,412.1/km^{2}
3	Sherbrooke	Large urban	151,157	140,300	+7.7%	102.61	1,473.1/km^{2}
4	Trois-Rivières	Large urban	128,057	124,158	+3.1%	98.58	1,299.0/km^{2}
5	Chicoutimi - Jonquière	Large urban	103,934	104,741	−0.8%	94.56	1,099.1/km^{2}
6	Saint-Jérôme	Large urban	100,859	91,205	+10.6%	96.97	1,040.1/km^{2}
7	Saint-Jean-sur-Richelieu	Medium	88,083	85,022	+3.6%	53.8	1,637.2/km^{2}
8	Châteauguay	Medium	75,891	71,164	+6.6%	50.48	1,503.4/km^{2}
9	Drummondville	Medium	72,089	68,634	+5.0%	52.3	1,378.4/km^{2}
10	Granby	Medium	62,624	59,706	+4.9%	48.39	1,294.2/km^{2}
11	Beloeil	Medium	52,959	51,132	+3.6%	26.5	1,998.5/km^{2}
12	Saint-Hyacinthe	Medium	50,616	50,104	+1.0%	30.8	1,643.4/km^{2}
13	Joliette	Medium	49,246	46,277	+6.4%	39.03	1,261.7/km^{2}
14	Victoriaville	Medium	46,322	44,735	+3.5%	35.27	1,313.4/km^{2}
15	Salaberry-de-Valleyfield	Medium	41,655	39,655	+5.0%	33.93	1,227.7/km^{2}
16	Shawinigan	Medium	38,930	38,695	+0.6%	31.77	1,225.4/km^{2}
17	Rimouski	Medium	38,708	38,478	+0.6%	27.79	1,392.9/km^{2}
18	Sorel	Medium	36,650	36,365	+0.8%	30.61	1,197.3/km^{2}
19	Saint-Georges	Small	27,402	27,103	+1.1%	27.09	1,011.5/km^{2}
20	Val-d'Or	Small	25,473	25,590	−0.5%	25.17	1,012.0/km^{2}
21	Hudson	Small	24,245	22,158	+9.4%	34.67	699.3/km^{2}
22	Rouyn-Noranda	Small	23,186	23,569	−1.6%	22.18	1,045.4/km^{2}
23	Magog	Small	22,222	21,001	+5.8%	19.57	1,135.5/km^{2}
24	Sept-Îles	Small	21,352	22,218	−3.9%	13.25	1,611.5/km^{2}
25	Varennes	Small	20,591	20,585	0.0%	10.36	1,987.5/km^{2}
26	Alma	Small	20,274	21,490	−5.7%	15.94	1,271.9/km^{2}
27	Les Coteaux	Small	19,582	17,396	+12.6%	18.13	1,080.1/km^{2}
28	Rivière-du-Loup	Small	19,081	18,321	+4.1%	20.17	946.0/km^{2}
29	Buckingham	Small	17,407	16,791	+3.7%	19.74	881.8/km^{2}
30	Thetford Mines	Small	17,046	16,236	+5.0%	15.1	1,128.9/km^{2}
31	L'Assomption	Small	16,443	16,024	+2.6%	11.63	1,413.8/km^{2}
32	Laurentides	Small	15,768	13,023	+21.1%	12.78	1,233.8/km^{2}
33	Port-Alfred-Bagotville	Small	13,350	13,865	−3.7%	13.11	1,018.3/km^{2}
34	Cowansville	Small	13,334	12,028	+10.9%	16.35	815.5/km^{2}
35	Sainte-Agathe-des-Monts - Val-David	Small	12,136	11,348	+6.9%	19.51	622.0/km^{2}
36	Saint-Augustin	Small	11,769	9,453	+24.5%	11.35	1,036.9/km^{2}
37	Lavaltrie	Small	11,301	10,767	+5.0%	7.03	1,607.5/km^{2}
38	Sainte-Anne-des-Plaines	Small	11,269	10,865	+3.7%	4.07	2,768.8/km^{2}
39	Lachute	Small	11,221	10,565	+6.2%	9.59	1,170.1/km^{2}
40	Saint-Amable	Small	11,199	10,144	+10.4%	7.9	1,417.6/km^{2}
41	Hauterive	Small	11,147	11,549	−3.5%	8.67	1,285.7/km^{2}
42	Dolbeau	Small	10,849	11,494	−5.6%	10.49	1,034.2/km^{2}
43	Sainte-Marie	Small	10,716	11,220	−4.5%	10.65	1,006.2/km^{2}
44	Matane	Small	10,371	10,787	−3.9%	10.16	1,020.8/km^{2}
45	Marieville	Small	10,015	9,253	+8.2%	6.74	1,485.9/km^{2}
46	Amos	Small	9,281	10,005	−7.2%	8.43	1,100.9/km^{2}
47	Baie-Comeau	Small	9,100	9,610	−5.3%	11.28	806.7/km^{2}
48	Donnacona	Small	8,952	8,564	+4.5%	9.78	915.3/km^{2}
49	Montmagny	Small	8,881	9,041	−1.8%	6.73	1,319.6/km^{2}
50	Saint-Sauveur-des-Monts	Small	8,854	7,849	+12.8%	10.06	880.1/km^{2}
51	Roberval	Small	8,056	8,360	−3.6%	5.36	1,503.0/km^{2}
52	Farnham	Small	7,869	6,772	+16.2%	5.93	1,327.0/km^{2}
53	Contrecoeur	Small	7,768	6,273	+23.8%	6.25	1,242.9/km^{2}
54	Mont-Laurier	Small	7,634	7,841	−2.6%	10.4	734.0/km^{2}
55	L'Épiphanie	Small	7,607	7,385	+3.0%	10.1	753.2/km^{2}
56	La Tuque	Small	7,464	7,571	−1.4%	6.33	1,179.1/km^{2}
57	Angers	Small	7,259	6,973	+4.1%	4.76	1,525.0/km^{2}
58	Plessisville	Small	7,028	7,228	−2.8%	5.87	1,197.3/km^{2}
59	Saint-Rémi	Small	7,025	6,891	+1.9%	4.01	1,751.9/km^{2}
60	Saint-Félicien	Small	6,751	7,096	−4.9%	8.58	786.8/km^{2}
61	Pont-Rouge	Small	6,579	6,262	+5.1%	6.67	986.4/km^{2}
62	Chibougamau	Small	6,491	6,862	−5.4%	6	1,081.8/km^{2}
63	Beaupré	Small	6,342	6,053	+4.8%	11.21	565.7/km^{2}
64	Coaticook	Small	6,333	6,524	−2.9%	8.7	727.9/km^{2}
65	Saint-Jovite	Small	6,206	5,744	+8.0%	11.41	543.9/km^{2}
66	Nicolet	Small	6,083	5,669	+7.3%	6.03	1,008.8/km^{2}
67	Sainte-Adèle	Small	6,019	5,894	+2.1%	9.1	661.4/km^{2}
68	Lac-Mégantic	Small	5,808	5,664	+2.5%	9.32	623.2/km^{2}
69	Mont-Joli	Small	5,730	5,660	+1.2%	7.96	719.8/km^{2}
70	Rawdon	Small	5,680	5,289	+7.4%	7.68	739.6/km^{2}
71	La Sarre	Small	5,629	5,547	+1.5%	5.9	954.1/km^{2}
72	Asbestos	Small	5,623	5,388	+4.4%	5.17	1,087.6/km^{2}
73	Louiseville	Small	5,577	5,416	+3.0%	4	1,394.3/km^{2}
74	Port-Cartier	Small	5,400	5,609	−3.7%	4.88	1,106.6/km^{2}
75	Bromont	Small	5,345	4,365	+22.5%	7.92	674.9/km^{2}
76	Acton Vale	Small	5,220	5,617	−7.1%	5.58	935.5/km^{2}
77	Windsor	Small	4,981	5,074	−1.8%	4.92	1,012.4/km^{2}
78	Saint-Apollinaire	Small	4,933	3,335	+47.9%	4.43	1,113.5/km^{2}
79	Sainte-Brigitte-de-Laval	Small	4,872	4,244	+14.8%	6.07	802.6/km^{2}
80	Napierville	Small	4,740	4,708	+0.7%	5.8	817.2/km^{2}
81	Waterloo	Small	4,727	4,273	+10.6%	7.74	610.7/km^{2}
82	Lac-Alouette	Small	4,687	4,557	+2.9%	6.78	691.3/km^{2}
83	Berthierville	Small	4,677	4,715	−0.8%	5.11	915.3/km^{2}
84	Amqui	Small	4,560	4,729	−3.6%	6.53	698.3/km^{2}
85	Sainte-Martine	Small	4,412	3,931	+12.2%	3.48	1,267.8/km^{2}
86	Princeville	Small	4,396	4,448	−1.2%	3.97	1,107.3/km^{2}
87	Terrasse-des-Pins	Small	4,395	4,382	+0.3%	6.53	673.0/km^{2}
88	Verchères	Small	4,359	4,429	−1.6%	2.99	1,457.9/km^{2}
89	Baie-Saint-Paul	Small	4,308	4,868	−11.5%	4.03	1,069.0/km^{2}
90	Maniwaki	Small	4,094	3,891	+5.2%	6.05	676.7/km^{2}
91	La Pocatière	Small	3,921	3,954	−0.8%	5.22	751.1/km^{2}
92	Saint-Césaire	Small	3,869	3,815	+1.4%	2.35	1,646.4/km^{2}
93	Bromptonville	Small	3,862	3,687	+4.7%	6.64	581.6/km^{2}
94	East Angus	Small	3,678	3,502	+5.0%	4.9	750.6/km^{2}
95	Beauceville	Small	3,598	3,769	−4.5%	6.07	592.8/km^{2}
96	Filion	Small	3,572	4,244	−15.8%	3.49	1,023.5/km^{2}
97	Chisasibi	Small	3,565	3,682	−3.2%	5.42	657.7/km^{2}
98	Saint-Félix-de-Valois	Small	3,544	2,978	+19.0%	4.07	870.8/km^{2}
99	La Malbaie	Small	3,534	3,520	+0.4%	3.97	890.2/km^{2}
100	Saint-Joseph-de-Beauce	Small	3,494	3,695	−5.4%	4.3	812.6/km^{2}
101	Sainte-Julienne	Small	3,469	3,263	+6.3%	6.49	534.5/km^{2}
102	Saint-Germain-de-Grantham	Small	3,436	3,485	−1.4%	2.66	1,291.7/km^{2}
103	Domaine-Ouellet	Small	3,391	2,894	+17.2%	1.17	2,898.3/km^{2}
104	Sainte-Anne-des-Monts	Small	3,370	3,576	−5.8%	6.43	524.1/km^{2}
105	Fossambault-sur-le-Lac	Small	3,367	2,931	+14.9%	6.44	522.8/km^{2}
106	Black Lake	Small	3,266	3,298	−1.0%	2.33	1,401.7/km^{2}
107	Warwick	Small	3,239	3,200	+1.2%	3.89	832.6/km^{2}
108	Mistissini	Small	3,190	3,523	−9.5%	3.05	1,045.9/km^{2}
109	Saint-Pie	Small	3,189	2,980	+7.0%	2.49	1,280.7/km^{2}
110	Saint-Agapit	Small	3,168	2,977	+6.4%	2.26	1,401.8/km^{2}
111	Shannon	Small	3,131	3,179	−1.5%	3.95	792.7/km^{2}
112	Richmond	Small	3,079	3,046	+1.1%	5.37	573.4/km^{2}
113	Saint-Gabriel	Small	3,068	2,895	+6.0%	3.54	866.7/km^{2}
114	Saint-Raymond	Small	3,057	3,242	−5.7%	4.37	699.5/km^{2}
115	Melocheville	Small	3,039	2,694	+12.8%	2.34	1,298.7/km^{2}
116	Rigaud	Small	3,038	3,613	−15.9%	2.49	1,220.1/km^{2}
117	Trois-Pistoles	Small	3,031	3,076	−1.5%	4.06	746.6/km^{2}
118	Malartic	Small	2,996	2,972	+0.8%	1.68	1,783.3/km^{2}
119	Havre-Saint-Pierre	Small	2,890	3,015	−4.1%	2.18	1,325.7/km^{2}
120	Saint-Joseph-de-Lanoraie	Small	2,850	2,576	+10.6%	2.89	986.2/km^{2}
121	Thurso	Small	2,833	2,533	+11.8%	3.07	922.8/km^{2}
122	Gaspé	Small	2,803	2,609	+7.4%	4.95	566.3/km^{2}
123	Crabtree	Small	2,802	3,025	−7.4%	2.02	1,387.1/km^{2}
124	Saint-Anselme	Small	2,729	2,688	+1.5%	3.35	814.6/km^{2}
125	Roxton Pond	Small	2,701	2,301	+17.4%	3.28	823.5/km^{2}
126	Clermont	Small	2,693	2,765	−2.6%	3.72	723.9/km^{2}
127	Huntingdon	Small	2,673	2,553	+4.7%	2.51	1,064.9/km^{2}
128	Saint-Jacques	Small	2,647	2,269	+16.7%	3.31	799.7/km^{2}
129	Bedford	Small	2,548	2,555	−0.3%	3.86	660.1/km^{2}
130	Ville Lambert	Small	2,544	2,596	−2.0%	2.67	952.8/km^{2}
131	Neuville	Small	2,543	2,512	+1.2%	3.98	638.9/km^{2}
132	Saint-Pascal	Small	2,534	2,471	+2.5%	3.35	756.4/km^{2}
133	Lac-Lapierre	Small	2,533	2,480	+2.1%	2.6	974.2/km^{2}
134	Cap-aux-Meules	Small	2,516	2,569	−2.1%	6.17	407.8/km^{2}
135	Château-Richer	Small	2,482	2,396	+3.6%	3.54	701.1/km^{2}
136	Cabano	Small	2,419	2,456	−1.5%	3.02	801.0/km^{2}
137	Saint-Honoré	Small	2,394	2,265	+5.7%	1.99	1,203.0/km^{2}
138	Évain	Small	2,329	2,441	−4.6%	1.97	1,182.2/km^{2}
139	Fort-Coulonge	Small	2,263	2,369	−4.5%	3.83	590.9/km^{2}
140	Disraeli	Small	2,228	2,212	+0.7%	2.59	860.2/km^{2}
141	Sainte-Claire	Small	2,226	2,389	−6.8%	1.8	1,236.7/km^{2}
142	Métabetchouan	Small	2,222	2,167	+2.5%	2.52	881.7/km^{2}
143	Les Cèdres	Small	2,214	2,233	−0.9%	1.79	1,236.9/km^{2}
144	Senneterre	Small	2,212	2,239	−1.2%	3.07	720.5/km^{2}
145	Forestville	Small	2,193	2,333	−6.0%	2.9	756.2/km^{2}
146	Saint-Tite	Small	2,190	2,381	−8.0%	2.69	814.1/km^{2}
147	Chandler	Small	2,189	2,285	−4.2%	1.93	1,134.2/km^{2}
148	Fermont	Small	2,151	2,288	−6.0%	1.45	1,483.4/km^{2}
149	Saint-Roch-de-l'Achigan	Small	2,136	1,949	+9.6%	1.41	1,514.9/km^{2}
150	Portneuf	Small	2,107	2,004	+5.1%	3.11	677.5/km^{2}
151	Betsiamites	Small	2,104	2,105	0.0%	1.78	1,182.0/km^{2}
152	Ville-Marie	Small	2,017	2,113	−4.5%	1.84	1,096.2/km^{2}
153	Saint-Prosper	Small	2,006	2,319	−13.5%	2.23	899.6/km^{2}
154	Saint-Marc-des-Carrières	Small	2,005	2,134	−6.0%	2.61	768.2/km^{2}
155	Sainte-Madeleine	Small	1,989	1,959	+1.5%	2.38	835.7/km^{2}
156	Kuujjuaq	Small	1,958	2,219	−11.8%	2.46	795.9/km^{2}
157	Lebel-sur-Quévillon	Small	1,931	2,015	−4.2%	2.33	828.8/km^{2}
158	Stoneham	Small	1,905	1,854	+2.8%	2.68	710.8/km^{2}
159	New Richmond	Small	1,886	1,901	−0.8%	4.04	466.8/km^{2}
160	Saint-Ambroise-de-Kildare	Small	1,883	1,792	+5.1%	2.47	762.3/km^{2}
161	Normandin	Small	1,880	1,910	−1.6%	1.93	974.1/km^{2}
162	Saint-Bruno	Small	1,868	1,756	+6.4%	1.16	1,610.3/km^{2}
163	East Broughton	Small	1,866	1,866	0.0%	1.57	1,188.5/km^{2}
164	Pierreville	Small	1,863	1,842	+1.1%	2.92	638.0/km^{2}
165	Laurier-Station	Small	1,856	1,894	−2.0%	2.97	624.9/km^{2}
166	Rivière-Beaudette	Small	1,854	1,592	+16.5%	3.47	534.3/km^{2}
167	Saint-Liboire	Small	1,844	1,775	+3.9%	2.15	857.7/km^{2}
168	Saint-Jean-Baptiste	Small	1,822	1,703	+7.0%	3.57	510.4/km^{2}
169	Waskaganish	Small	1,807	1,839	−1.7%	0.81	2,230.9/km^{2}
170	Valcourt	Small	1,805	1,806	−0.1%	2.97	607.7/km^{2}
171	Ormstown	Small	1,785	1,735	+2.9%	2.06	866.5/km^{2}
−	Grenville (Note: The Quebec part of the Hawkesbury, Ont. population centre.)	Small	1,780	1,677	+6.1%	2.06	717.7/km^{2}
172	Lac-Etchemin	Small	1,769	1,782	−0.7%	1.65	1,072.1/km^{2}
173	Saint-Sulpice	Small	1,769	1,853	−4.5%	1.17	1,512.0/km^{2}
174	Saint-Henri-de-Lévis	Small	1,761	1,735	+1.5%	0.95	1,853.7/km^{2}
175	Sainte-Catherine-de-la-Jacques-Cartier	Small	1,757	1,643	+6.9%	0.83	2,116.9/km^{2}
176	Dégelis	Small	1,751	1,798	−2.6%	2.17	806.9/km^{2}
177	Saint-Michel	Small	1,745	1,558	+12.0%	1.06	1,646.2/km^{2}
178	Lacolle	Small	1,729	1,601	+8.0%	3.41	507.0/km^{2}
179	L'Ange-Gardien	Small	1,720	1,600	+7.5%	1.47	1,170.1/km^{2}
180	Val-Maher	Small	1,674	1,668	+0.4%	2.98	561.7/km^{2}
181	Saint-Martin	Small	1,672	1,592	+5.0%	3.37	496.1/km^{2}
182	Inukjuak	Small	1,671	1,438	+16.2%	1.98	843.9/km^{2}
183	Rougemont	Small	1,668	1,593	+4.7%	3.33	500.9/km^{2}
184	Ferme-Neuve	Small	1,663	1,706	−2.5%	1.6	1,039.4/km^{2}
185	Domaine-C.-L.-C.	Small	1,662	1,521	+9.3%	1.91	870.2/km^{2}
186	Danville	Small	1,652	1,577	+4.8%	2.34	706.0/km^{2}
187	Saint Grégoire	Small	1,651	1,597	+3.4%	1.4	1,179.3/km^{2}
188	Saint-Ambroise	Small	1,651	1,678	−1.6%	0.89	1,855.1/km^{2}
189	Saint-André-Avellin	Small	1,642	1,903	−13.7%	2.38	689.9/km^{2}
190	Price	Small	1,640	1,679	−2.3%	1.89	867.7/km^{2}
191	Gentilly	Small	1,634	1,673	−2.3%	1.6	1,021.3/km^{2}
192	Manawan	Small	1,597	1,648	−3.1%	0.86	1,857.0/km^{2}
193	Saint-Thomas	Small	1,589	1,416	+12.2%	1.63	974.8/km^{2}
194	Alençon	Small	1,585	1,567	+1.1%	2.98	531.9/km^{2}
195	Saint-Donat-de-Montcalm	Small	1,512	1,479	+2.2%	3.26	463.8/km^{2}
196	Saint-Alexis-des-Monts	Small	1,503	1,546	−2.8%	3.37	446.0/km^{2}
197	Stanstead	Small	1,483	1,475	+0.5%	2.35	631.1/km^{2}
198	Saint-Léonard-d'Aston	Small	1,469	1,336	+10.0%	1.6	918.1/km^{2}
199	Saint-Alexandre	Small	1,466	1,304	+12.4%	1.93	759.6/km^{2}
200	Godefroy	Small	1,463	1,410	+3.8%	0.79	1,851.9/km^{2}
201	Maliotenam	Small	1,458	1,363	+7.0%	0.8	1,822.5/km^{2}
202	Puvirnituq	Small	1,456	1,038	+40.3%	0.87	1,673.6/km^{2}
203	Saint-Étienne-des-Grès	Small	1,455	1,407	+3.4%	2.42	601.2/km^{2}
204	Bonaventure	Small	1,447	1,439	+0.6%	2.85	507.7/km^{2}
205	Saint-Basile-Sud	Small	1,444	1,387	+4.1%	1.94	744.3/km^{2}
206	Saint-Gédéon	Small	1,439	1,542	−6.7%	2.42	594.6/km^{2}
207	Scott	Small	1,433	1,293	+10.8%	2.64	542.8/km^{2}
208	Sainte-Croix	Small	1,424	1,401	+1.6%	2.29	621.8/km^{2}
209	Maria	Small	1,421	1,422	−0.1%	2.97	478.5/km^{2}
210	Kingsey Falls	Small	1,419	1,452	−2.3%	2.77	512.3/km^{2}
211	Whapmagoostui - Kuujjuarapik	Small	1,411	365	+286.6%	0.9	1,567.8/km^{2}
212	Maskinongé	Small	1,409	1,368	+3.0%	2.15	655.3/km^{2}
213	Linière	Small	1,400	1,385	+1.1%	1.61	869.6/km^{2}
214	Saint-Jean-Port-Joli	Small	1,381	1,407	−1.8%	1.71	807.6/km^{2}
215	Saint-Éphrem-de-Tring	Small	1,373	1,385	−0.9%	1.98	693.4/km^{2}
216	Saint-Boniface	Small	1,365	1,307	+4.4%	2.43	561.7/km^{2}
217	Saint-Polycarpe	Small	1,365	1,165	+17.2%	0.86	1,587.2/km^{2}
218	Saint-Charles	Small	1,357	1,482	−8.4%	1.38	983.3/km^{2}
219	Macamic	Small	1,352	1,307	+3.4%	2	676.0/km^{2}
220	Daveluyville	Small	1,345	1,306	+3.0%	2.53	531.6/km^{2}
221	Saint-Alexandre	Small	1,342	1,093	+22.8%	1.29	1,040.3/km^{2}
222	Matagami	Small	1,340	1,396	−4.0%	1.73	774.6/km^{2}
223	Grande-Rivière	Small	1,330	1,517	−12.3%	3.31	401.8/km^{2}
224	Shawville	Small	1,329	1,203	+10.5%	1.89	703.2/km^{2}
225	Wemindji	Small	1,324	1,209	+9.5%	0.71	1,864.8/km^{2}
226	Brownsburg	Small	1,315	1,425	−7.7%	1	1,315.0/km^{2}
227	Saint-Cyrille-de-Wendover	Small	1,315	1,216	+8.1%	0.94	1,398.9/km^{2}
228	Témiscaming	Small	1,308	1,361	−3.9%	1.24	1,054.8/km^{2}
229	Sainte-Thècle	Small	1,302	1,375	−5.3%	2.29	568.6/km^{2}
230	Oka	Small	1,299	1,269	+2.4%	1	1,299.0/km^{2}
231	Chapais	Small	1,289	1,318	−2.2%	1.03	1,251.5/km^{2}
232	Les Escoumins	Small	1,274	1,339	−4.9%	1.61	791.3/km^{2}
233	Lac-Connelly	Small	1,272	1,212	+5.0%	2.16	588.9/km^{2}
234	Obedjiwan	Small	1,259	1,404	−10.3%	0.63	1,998.4/km^{2}
235	Parc-Boutin	Small	1,246	1,127	+10.6%	2.67	466.7/km^{2}
236	Labelle	Small	1,244	1,179	+5.5%	2.77	449.1/km^{2}
237	Saint-Michel-de-Bellechasse	Small	1,243	1,208	+2.9%	1.89	657.7/km^{2}
238	Saint-Bernard	Small	1,223	1,075	+13.8%	0.88	1,389.8/km^{2}
239	Yamachiche	Small	1,222	1,245	−1.8%	1.85	660.5/km^{2}
240	Vallée-Jonction	Small	1,213	1,273	−4.7%	1.06	1,144.3/km^{2}
241	Beaumont	Small	1,209	1,210	−0.1%	1.64	737.2/km^{2}
242	Notre-Dame-du-Lac	Small	1,207	1,184	+1.9%	2.6	464.2/km^{2}
243	Saint-Damien-de-Buckland	Small	1,206	1,203	+0.2%	1.56	773.1/km^{2}
244	Carleton	Small	1,198	1,117	+7.3%	1.03	1,163.1/km^{2}
245	LeBlanc	Small	1,186	1,518	−21.9%	1.69	701.8/km^{2}
246	Saint-Chrysostome	Small	1,171	1,218	−3.9%	1.44	813.2/km^{2}
247	Cap-Saint-Ignace	Small	1,160	1,214	−4.4%	2.47	469.6/km^{2}
248	Saint-Elzéar	Small	1,152	1,122	+2.7%	0.66	1,745.5/km^{2}
249	Notre-Dame-du-Bon-Conseil	Small	1,149	1,018	+12.9%	1.39	826.6/km^{2}
250	Saint-Pacôme	Small	1,145	940	+21.8%	1.16	987.1/km^{2}
251	Saint-Damase	Small	1,139	1,138	+0.1%	1.99	572.4/km^{2}
252	Lac-Simon	Small	1,134	1,333	−14.9%	2.25	504.0/km^{2}
253	Le Bic	Small	1,132	1,115	+1.5%	1.23	920.3/km^{2}
254	Notre-Dame-du-Mont-Carmel	Small	1,126	1,091	+3.2%	1.25	900.8/km^{2}
255	Papineauville	Small	1,126	1,105	+1.9%	1.58	712.7/km^{2}
256	Saint-Jean-de-Matha	Small	1,121	1,004	+11.7%	2.33	481.1/km^{2}
257	Luceville	Small	1,118	1,143	−2.2%	1.33	840.6/km^{2}
258	Salluit	Small	1,107	1,255	−11.8%	0.76	1,456.6/km^{2}
259	Saint-Michel-des-Saints	Small	1,106	1,131	−2.2%	1.76	628.4/km^{2}
260	Saint-Raphaël	Small	1,093	1,113	−1.8%	1.08	1,012.0/km^{2}
261	Barraute	Small	1,090	1,099	−0.8%	1.32	825.8/km^{2}
262	Ayer's Cliff	Small	1,087	963	+12.9%	2.32	468.5/km^{2}
263	Sainte-Justine	Small	1,079	1,077	+0.2%	1.18	914.4/km^{2}
264	Saint-Prime	Small	1,069	1,021	+4.7%	1.05	1,018.1/km^{2}
265	Venise-en-Québec	Small	1,069	920	+16.2%	1.43	747.6/km^{2}
266	Saint-Fabien	Small	1,067	1,145	−6.8%	1.53	697.4/km^{2}
267	Saint-Denis	Small	1,048	985	+6.4%	1.07	979.4/km^{2}
268	Rivière-au-Renard	Small	1,045	1,106	−5.5%	2.1	497.6/km^{2}
269	Roxton Falls	Small	1,042	1,046	−0.4%	2.28	457.0/km^{2}
270	Montagnac	Small	1,041	913	+14.0%	2.6	400.4/km^{2}
271	Saint-Roch-de-Richelieu	Small	1,031	841	+22.6%	1.49	691.9/km^{2}
272	Mont-Saint-Grégoire	Small	1,021	1,015	+0.6%	1.4	729.3/km^{2}
273	Causapscal	Small	1,013	1,041	−2.7%	1.77	572.3/km^{2}

== See also ==
- List of cities and towns in Quebec
- List of the largest population centres in Canada
