= List of the largest population centres in Canada =

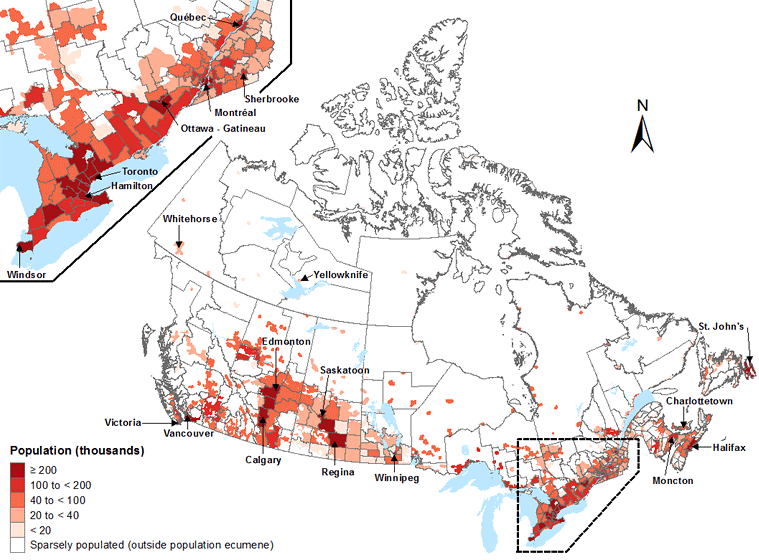
Canada's population density per Census Division (CD, 2014)

A population centre, in the context of a Canadian census, is a populated place, or a cluster of interrelated populated places, which meets the demographic characteristics of an urban area, having a population of at least 1,000 people and a population density of no fewer than 400 people per square km^{2}.

The term was introduced in the Canada 2011 Census; prior to that, Statistics Canada used the term urban area.

Statistics Canada listed 944 population centres in its 2011 census data; 513 of them, 54 per cent of all population centres in Canada, were located in Ontario or Quebec, the two most populous provinces.

== History ==
The term "population centre" was chosen in order to better reflect the fact that urban vs. rural is not a strict division, but rather a continuum within which several distinct settlement patterns, and several competing interpretations of the distinction, may exist. For example, a community may fit a strictly statistical definition of an urban area, but may not be commonly thought of as "urban" because it has a smaller population, or because it functions socially and economically as a suburb of another urban area rather than as a self-contained urban entity, or because it is geographically remote from other urban communities. Municipal boundaries are ignored in determining population centres and they are focused entirely on their geographic and built-up nature.

Accordingly, the new definition set out three distinct types of population centres: small (population 1,000 to 29,999), medium (population 30,000 to 99,999) and large (population 100,000 or greater). Despite the change in terminology, however, the demographic definition of a population centre remains unchanged from that of an urban area: a population of at least 1,000 people where the density is no fewer than 400 persons per square kilometre.

== Characteristics ==
A population centre does not necessarily correspond to the boundaries of a municipality or of a census division. For example, a less densely populated area within a city's municipal boundaries may not be included as part of its population centre, while areas outside the city limits that directly continue a city's urban core population may be included.

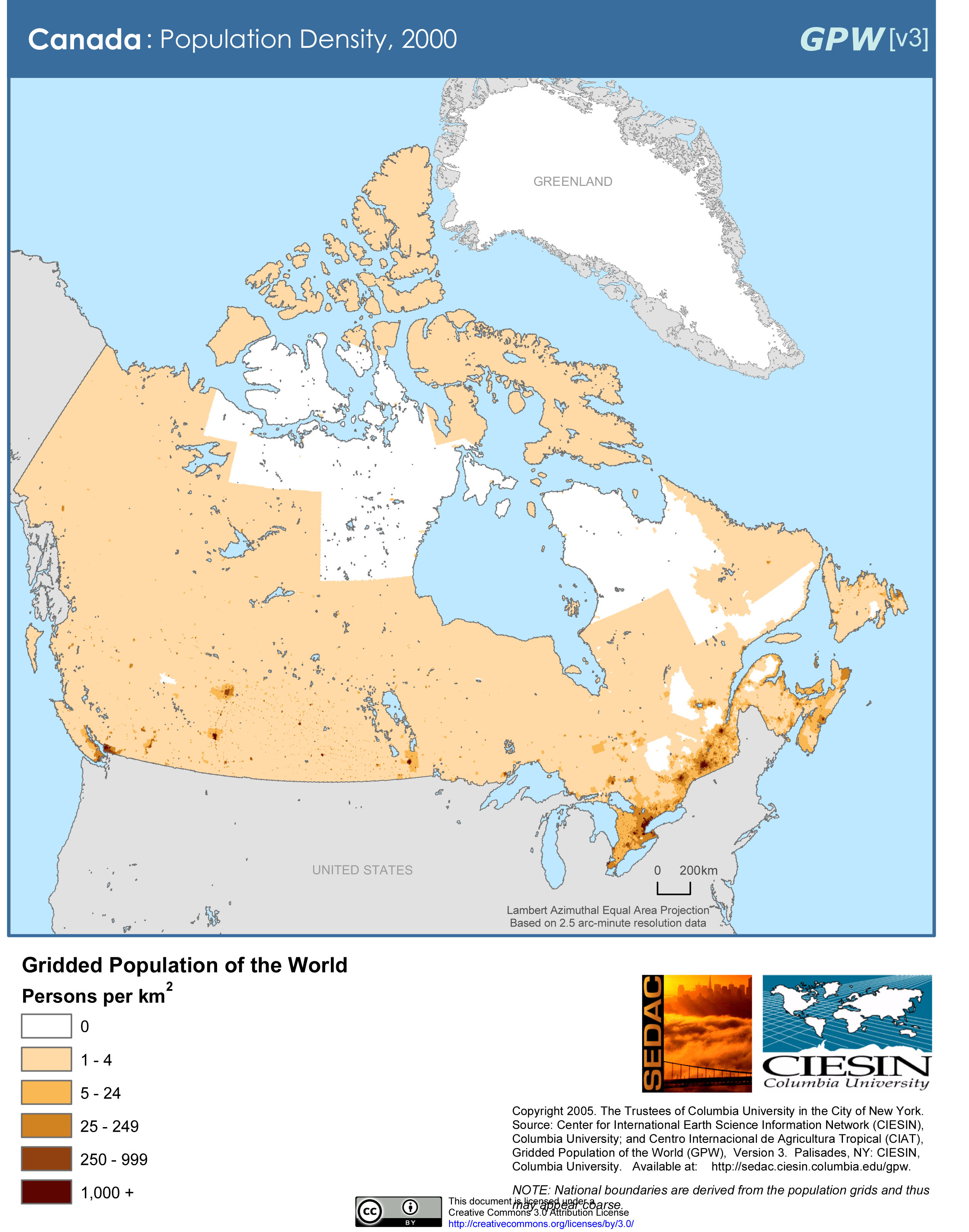
Canada population density map (2000)

For example, the population centre of Toronto extends into neighbouring Peel Region, Halton Region, Durham Region and York Region, encompassing places such as Oakville, Mississauga, Brampton, Vaughan, Markham, Richmond Hill, Aurora, Newmarket, Pickering and Ajax. Despite this, numerous other communities which are considered part of the Greater Toronto Area for political purposes are not part of the population centre of Toronto; because more rural areas separate them geographically from the primary zone of urban settlement, communities such as Milton, Georgetown, Caledon East, Bolton, Nobleton, and Stouffville instead form their own separate small or medium population centres, and even a portion of the city of Toronto itself, to the north and east of the Toronto Zoo in Scarborough, is excluded from the population centre as it is much less densely populated than the rest of the city.

However, the Statistics Canada definition of a population centre is that it does not cross the boundaries of a Census Metropolitan Area (CMA); even though the band of continuous urban development emanating outward from downtown Toronto along the shore of Lake Ontario extends even further into Hamilton and Oshawa, these two cities are both considered separate CMAs by Statistics Canada rather than being part of Toronto's, and accordingly each is also considered a distinct population centre.

Conversely, a single municipality may also contain more than one distinct population centre, if less densely populated or undeveloped regions separate more urbanized areas from one another. For example, Ottawa has seven distinct population centres (Ottawa-Gatineau, Constance Bay, Kanata, Richmond, Osgoode, Manotick and Metcalfe), the neighbouring city of Gatineau has a secondary population centre at Buckingham in addition to its primary urban core forming part of Ottawa-Gatineau, and Greater Sudbury has eight distinct population centres (Sudbury, Azilda, Capreol, Chelmsford, Coniston, Dowling, Lively and Valley East).

== Lists ==
=== By population rank ===
Rank	Population centre	Province	Size group	Population (2021)	Population (2016)	Change	Land area (km^{2})	Population density (/km^{2})
1	Toronto	Ontario	Large urban	5,647,656	5,433,590	+3.9%	1,829.05	3,087.8
2	Montreal	Quebec	Large urban	3,675,219	3,528,651	+4.2%	1,382.47	2,658.4
3	Vancouver	British Columbia	Large urban	2,426,160	2,268,864	+6.9%	911.64	2,661.3
4	Calgary	Alberta	Large urban	1,305,550	1,240,413	+5.3%	621.72	2,099.9
5	Edmonton	Alberta	Large urban	1,151,635	1,070,998	+7.5%	627.2	1,836.2
6	Ottawa–Gatineau	Ontario / Quebec	Large urban	1,068,821	994,576	+7.5%	549.49	1,945.1
7	Winnipeg	Manitoba	Large urban	758,515	712,858	+6.4%	356.99	2,124.8
8	Quebec City	Quebec	Large urban	733,156	708,280	+3.5%	442.85	1,655.5
9	Hamilton	Ontario	Large urban	729,560	693,362	+5.2%	356.03	2,049.2
10	Kitchener	Ontario	Large urban	522,888	473,230	+10.5%	296.45	1,763.8
11	London	Ontario	Large urban	423,369	384,784	+10.0%	244.97	1,728.2
12	Victoria	British Columbia	Large urban	363,222	337,235	+7.7%	222.71	1,630.9
13	Halifax	Nova Scotia	Large urban	348,634	317,334	+9.9%	238.29	1,463.1
14	Oshawa	Ontario	Large urban	335,949	309,759	+8.5%	159.79	2,102.4
15	Windsor	Ontario	Large urban	306,519	288,363	+6.3%	184.96	1,657.2
16	Saskatoon	Saskatchewan	Large urban	264,637	245,904	+7.6%	134.63	1,965.7
17	St. Catharines – Niagara Falls	Ontario	Large urban	242,460	229,776	+5.5%	140.59	1,724.6
18	Regina	Saskatchewan	Large urban	224,996	214,664	+4.8%	105.61	2,130.4
19	St. John's	Newfoundland and Labrador	Large urban	185,565	181,955	+2.0%	178	1,042.5
20	Kelowna	British Columbia	Large urban	181,380	160,095	+13.3%	168.92	1,073.8
21	Barrie	Ontario	Large urban	154,676	146,394	+5.7%	95.33	1,622.5
22	Sherbrooke	Quebec	Large urban	151,157	140,300	+7.7%	102.61	1,473.1
23	Guelph	Ontario	Large urban	144,356	132,705	+8.8%	79.57	1,814.2
24	Kanata	Ontario	Large urban	137,118	118,308	+15.9%	62.35	2,199.2
25	Abbotsford	British Columbia	Large urban	132,300	122,163	+8.3%	71.2	1,858.1
26	Trois-Rivières	Quebec	Large urban	128,057	124,158	+3.1%	98.58	1,299.0
27	Kingston	Ontario	Large urban	127,943	119,061	+7.5%	83.43	1,533.5
28	Milton	Ontario	Large urban	124,579	101,885	+22.3%	45.2	2,756.2
29	Moncton	New Brunswick	Large urban	119,785	109,075	+9.8%	110.73	1,081.8
30	White Rock	British Columbia	Large urban	109,167	93,811	+16.4%	54.23	2,013.0
31	Nanaimo	British Columbia	Large urban	106,079	96,415	+10.0%	86.76	1,222.7
32	Brantford	Ontario	Large urban	104,413	98,250	+6.3%	62.13	1,680.6
33	Chicoutimi – Jonquière	Quebec	Large urban	103,934	104,741	−0.8%	94.56	1,099.1
34	Saint-Jérôme	Quebec	Large urban	100,859	91,205	+10.6%	96.97	1,040.1
35	Red Deer	Alberta	Medium	99,846	99,773	+0.1%	65.93	1,514.4
36	Thunder Bay	Ontario	Medium	95,266	94,767	+0.5%	76.03	1,253.0
37	Lethbridge	Alberta	Medium	92,563	89,309	+3.6%	64	1,446.3
38	Kamloops	British Columbia	Medium	92,442	85,702	+7.9%	74.35	1,243.3
39	Sudbury	Ontario	Medium	92,093	88,155	+4.5%	75.79	1,215.1
40	Saint-Jean-sur-Richelieu	Quebec	Medium	88,083	85,022	+3.6%	53.8	1,637.2
41	Peterborough	Ontario	Medium	84,793	82,149	+3.2%	54.58	1,553.6
42	Chilliwack	British Columbia	Medium	81,622	73,171	+11.5%	56.02	1,457.0
43	Châteauguay	Quebec	Medium	75,891	71,164	+6.6%	50.48	1,503.4
44	Belleville	Ontario	Medium	75,052	68,859	+9.0%	89.48	838.8
45	Sarnia	Ontario	Medium	73,944	73,403	+0.7%	60.53	1,221.6
46	Airdrie	Alberta	Medium	73,578	61,082	+20.5%	33.03	2,227.6
47	Drummondville	Quebec	Medium	72,089	68,634	+5.0%	52.3	1,378.4
48	Welland – Pelham	Ontario	Medium	69,302	63,011	+10.0%	57.21	1,211.4
49	Fort McMurray	Alberta	Medium	68,002	67,123	+1.3%	52.17	1,303.5
50	Prince George	British Columbia	Medium	67,339	66,315	+1.5%	73.9	911.2
51	Sault Ste. Marie	Ontario	Medium	64,923	66,313	−2.1%	52.97	1,225.7
52	Fredericton	New Brunswick	Medium	64,614	61,014	+5.9%	89.6	721.1
53	Saint John	New Brunswick	Medium	63,447	61,152	+3.8%	70.05	905.7
54	Medicine Hat	Alberta	Medium	63,382	63,111	+0.4%	53.2	1,191.4
55	Grande Prairie	Alberta	Medium	63,172	62,382	+1.3%	49.74	1,270.0
56	Granby	Quebec	Medium	62,624	59,706	+4.9%	48.39	1,294.2
57	Bowmanville – Newcastle	Ontario	Medium	56,742	48,929	+16.0%	31.23	1,816.9
58	Beloeil	Quebec	Medium	52,959	51,132	+3.6%	26.5	1,998.5
59	Charlottetown	Prince Edward Island	Medium	52,390	48,054	+9.0%	57.56	910.2
60	Vernon	British Columbia	Medium	51,896	48,425	+7.2%	51.16	1,014.4
61	North Bay	Ontario	Medium	51,433	50,396	+2.1%	64.91	792.4
62	Saint-Hyacinthe	Quebec	Medium	50,616	50,104	+1.0%	30.8	1,643.4
63	Brandon	Manitoba	Medium	50,532	48,345	+4.5%	28.73	1,758.9
64	Joliette	Quebec	Medium	49,246	46,277	+6.4%	39.03	1,261.7
65	Courtenay	British Columbia	Medium	48,917	45,314	+8.0%	56.58	864.6
66	Cornwall	Ontario	Medium	47,286	46,114	+2.5%	32.4	1,459.4
67	Victoriaville	Quebec	Medium	46,322	44,735	+3.5%	35.27	1,313.4
68	Woodstock	Ontario	Medium	46,296	40,614	+14.0%	34.41	1,345.4
69	St. Thomas	Ontario	Medium	45,732	41,834	+9.3%	28.1	1,627.5
70	Chatham	Ontario	Medium	45,171	43,550	+3.7%	31.21	1,447.3
71	Georgetown	Ontario	Medium	44,058	42,326	+4.1%	25.7	1,714.3
72	Salaberry-de-Valleyfield	Quebec	Medium	41,655	39,655	+5.0%	33.93	1,227.7
73	Spruce Grove	Alberta	Medium	39,348	36,279	+8.5%	29.76	1,322.2
74	Shawinigan	Quebec	Medium	38,930	38,695	+0.6%	31.77	1,225.4
75	Rimouski	Quebec	Medium	38,708	38,478	+0.6%	27.79	1,392.9
76	Bradford	Ontario	Medium	38,128	30,765	+23.9%	16.1	2,368.2
77	Campbell River	British Columbia	Medium	38,108	35,440	+7.5%	33	1,154.8
78	Penticton	British Columbia	Medium	36,893	33,899	+8.8%	25.84	1,427.7
79	Prince Albert	Saskatchewan	Medium	36,768	35,102	+4.7%	21.37	1,720.5
80	Stouffville	Ontario	Medium	36,753	32,634	+12.6%	14.17	2,593.7
81	Sorel	Quebec	Medium	36,650	36,365	+0.8%	30.61	1,197.3
82	Mission	British Columbia	Medium	36,193	33,713	+7.4%	27.23	1,329.2
83	Leamington	Ontario	Medium	35,730	33,049	+8.1%	31.77	1,124.6
84	Orangeville	Ontario	Medium	34,177	32,318	+5.8%	19.77	1,728.7
85	Leduc	Alberta	Medium	33,505	29,561	+13.3%	67.43	496.9
86	Orillia	Ontario	Medium	33,379	31,128	+7.2%	22.68	1,471.7
87	Stratford	Ontario	Medium	32,878	31,094	+5.7%	23.3	1,411.1
88	Moose Jaw	Saskatchewan	Medium	32,813	32,993	−0.5%	22.14	1,482.1
89	Cochrane	Alberta	Medium	31,638	25,501	+24.1%	23.71	1,334.4
90	Lloydminster	Alberta / Saskatchewan	Medium	31,582	31,400	+0.6%	24.43	1,292.8
91	Cape Breton – Sydney	Nova Scotia	Medium	30,960	30,170	+2.6%	30.91	1,001.6
92	Okotoks	Alberta	Medium	30,214	28,833	+4.8%	17.23	1,753.6
93	Innisfil	Ontario	Small	29,464	24,277	+21.4%	23.71	1,242.7
94	Timmins	Ontario	Small	28,874	29,331	−1.6%	18.49	1,561.6
95	Saint-Georges	Quebec	Small	27,402	27,103	+1.1%	27.09	1,011.5
96	Parksville	British Columbia	Small	27,330	25,364	+7.8%	27.45	995.6
97	Keswick – Elmhurst Beach	Ontario	Small	27,145	26,999	+0.5%	16.56	1,639.2
98	Fort Saskatchewan	Alberta	Small	26,831	23,944	+12.1%	21.85	1,228.0
99	Bolton	Ontario	Small	26,795	26,378	+1.6%	20.71	1,293.8
100	Midland	Ontario	Small	26,246	24,443	+7.4%	27.41	957.5

=== By province or territory ===
- List of population centres in Alberta
- List of population centres in British Columbia
- List of population centres in the Canadian Territories
- List of population centres in Manitoba
- List of population centres in New Brunswick
- List of population centres in Newfoundland and Labrador
- List of population centres in Nova Scotia
- List of population centres in Ontario
- List of population centres in Prince Edward Island
- List of population centres in Quebec
- List of population centres in Saskatchewan

== See also ==
- List of the largest cities and towns in Canada by area
- List of census metropolitan areas and agglomerations in Canada
- Population of Canada by province and territory
- List of largest Canadian cities by census
- Population of Canada by year
- List of cities in Canada
- List of towns in Canada
- Regional municipality
