= List of united township municipalities in Quebec =

This is a list of municipalities of Quebec municipality type united township municipality (cantons unis, code=CU). It is an administrative division of Quebec defined by the Ministry of Municipal Affairs, Regions and Land Occupancy.

== United township municipalities ==
(area is in km², population as of 2006)

Name	RCM	Region	Area	Population
Latulipe-et-Gaboury	Témiscamingue	Abitibi-Témiscamingue	269.02	333
Stoneham-et-Tewkesbury	La Jacques-Cartier	Capitale-Nationale	671.63	5866

The last previous united township municipalities were:

- Alleyn-et-Cawood, which changed its status to an ordinary municipality on February 7, 2004;
- Leslie-Clapham-et-Huddersfield, which changed its status to an ordinary municipality and its name to Otter Lake on December 20, 2003;
- Mansfield-et-Pontefract, which changed its status to an ordinary municipality on October 11, 2003;
- Sheen-Esher-Aberdeen-et-Malakoff, which changed its status to an ordinary municipality and its name to Sheenboro on October 11, 2003;
- Mulgrave-et-Derry, which changed its status to an ordinary municipality on August 2, 2003.

== See also ==
- List of township municipalities in Quebec
