= List of population centres in the Canadian territories =

A population centre, in Canadian census data, is a populated place, or a cluster of interrelated populated places, which meets the demographic characteristics of an urban area, having a population of at least 1,000 people and a population density of no fewer than 400 persons per square km^{2}.

The term was first introduced in the Canada 2011 Census; prior to that, Statistics Canada used the term urban area.

== Northwest Territories ==
In the 2021 Census of Population, Statistics Canada listed four population centres in the Northwest Territories.

Rank	Population centre	Size group	Population (2021)	Population (2016)	Change	Land area (km^{2})	Population density
1	Yellowknife	Small	19,673	19,141	+2.8%	18.11	1,086.3/km^{2}
2	Inuvik	Small	3,001	3,140	−4.4%	1.6	1,875.6/km^{2}
3	Hay River	Small	2,380	2,728	−12.8%	3.16	753.2/km^{2}
4	Fort Smith	Small	1,749	2,031	−13.9%	2.04	857.4/km^{2}

== Nunavut ==
In the 2021 Census of Population, Statistics Canada listed six population centres in Nunavut. The former population centre of Kugluktuk was retired.

Rank	Population centre	Size group	Population (2021)	Population (2016)	Change	Land area (km^{2})	Population density
1	Iqaluit	Small	6,991	7,323	−4.5%	10.48	667.1/km^{2}
2	Arviat	Small	2,766	2,581	+7.2%	2.42	1,143.0/km^{2}
3	Rankin Inlet	Small	2,698	2,608	+3.5%	2.86	943.4/km^{2}
4	Baker Lake	Small	1,653	1,690	−2.2%	1.56	1,059.6/km^{2}
5	Cambridge Bay	Small	1,403	1,619	−13.3%	0.85	1,650.6/km^{2}
6	Gjoa Haven	Small	1,110	1,197	−7.3%	0.7	1,585.7/km^{2}

== Yukon ==
In the 2021 Census of Population, Statistics Canada listed two population centres in Yukon.

Rank	Population centre	Size group	Population (2021)	Population (2016)	Change	Land area (km^{2})	Population density
1	Whitehorse	Small	24,513	21,770	+12.6%	35.97	681.5/km^{2}
2	Dawson	Small	1,092	957	+14.1%	1.05	1,040.0/km^{2}

== See also ==
- List of the largest population centres in Canada
- List of municipalities in Yukon
- List of municipalities in the Northwest Territories
- List of municipalities in Nunavut
