= List of population centres in Prince Edward Island =

A population centre, in Canadian census data, is a populated place, or a cluster of interrelated populated places, which meets the demographic characteristics of an urban area, having a population of at least 1,000 people and a population density of no fewer than 400 persons per square km^{2}.

The term was first introduced in the Canada 2011 Census; prior to that, Statistics Canada used the term urban area.

In the 2021 Census of Population, Statistics Canada listed four population centres in the province of Prince Edward Island.

== List ==
The below table is a list of those population centres in Prince Edward Island from the 2021 Census of Population as designated, named, and delineated by Statistics Canada.

Rank	Population centre	Size group	Population (2021)	Population (2016)	Change	Land area (km^{2})	Population density
1	Charlottetown	Medium	52,390	48,054	+9.0%	57.56	910.2/km^{2}
2	Summerside	Small	14,952	13,969	+7.0%	16.97	881.1/km^{2}
3	Montague	Small	1,896	1,834	+3.4%	2.07	915.9/km^{2}
4	Kensington	Small	1,743	1,618	+7.7%	2.74	636.1/km^{2}

== Retired population centres ==
The former population centre of Cornwall was absorbed into the population centre of Charlottetown for the 2021 census.

== See also ==
- List of the largest population centres in Canada
- List of population centres in Nova Scotia
- List of population centres in New Brunswick
