= List of largest Canadian cities by census =

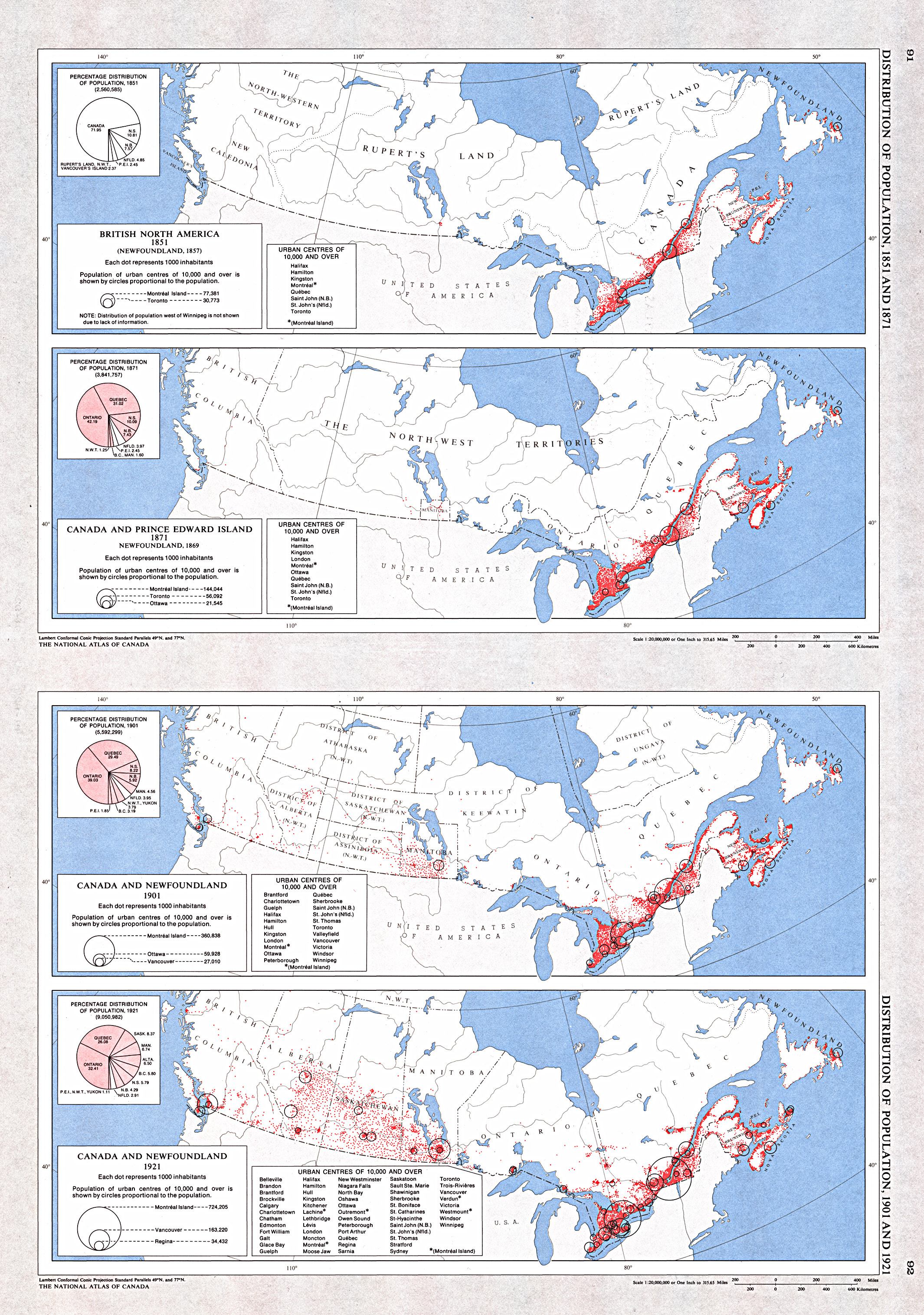
A collection of four maps showing the distribution of population for 1851 (Newfoundland 1857), 1871 (Newfoundland 1869), 1901 and 1921 by historical region.

This is a list of the largest cities in Canada by census starting with the 1871 census of Canada, the first national census.

In the earlier census, only communities that were incorporated as cities at the time of each census are presented. Therefore, the list does not include any incorporated towns (T) that may have been larger than any incorporated cities at each census.

As various provinces take divergent approaches toward municipal governance, population figures that confined strictly to formal municipal boundary became less meaningful data. In recognition of the close economic or geographical relationship and community of interest satellite communities in proximity to cities but may be outside the formal boundaries of the incorporated municipal entities, reporting of data for metropolitan areas started to appear in the 1941 census, and were formalized as statistics for census metropolitan areas (CMA) in the 1951 census.

== 1871 ==
Rank	City	Province	Population	Notes
1	Montreal	Quebec	107,225	Ranked second largest city in 2021.
2	Quebec City	Quebec	59,699	Ranked twelfth largest city in 2021.
3	Toronto	Ontario	56,092	Ranked largest city in 2021.
4	Halifax	Nova Scotia	29,582	Ranked fourteenth largest municipality in 2021.
5	Saint John	New Brunswick	28,805	Saint John was incorporated in 1785 to become Canada's first incorporated city. Ranked eighty-fourth largest city in 2021.
6	Hamilton	Ontario	26,716	Ranked tenth largest city in 2021.
7	Ottawa	Ontario	21,545	Ranked fourth largest city in 2021.
8	London	Ontario	15,826	Ranked fifteenth largest city in 2021.
9	Portland	New Brunswick	12,520	Portland was a city until 1889, when it amalgamated with Saint John.
10	Kingston	Ontario	12,407	Ranked forty-fifth largest city in 2021.

== 1881 ==
Rank	City	Province	Population
1	Montreal	Quebec	140,747
2	Toronto	Ontario	86,415
3	Quebec City	Quebec	62,446
4	Halifax	Nova Scotia	36,054
5	Hamilton	Ontario	35,961
6	Ottawa	Ontario	27,412
7	Saint John	New Brunswick	26,127
8	London	Ontario	19,746
9	Portland	New Brunswick	15,226
10	Kingston	Ontario	14,091

== 1891 ==
Winnipeg, Manitoba, becomes the first city in Western Canada to appear on the Top 10 list, cutting The Maritimes from three spots on the list – on both (all) of the previous censuses – to two.

Rank	City	Province	Population
1	Montreal	Quebec	216,650
2	Toronto	Ontario	181,220
3	Quebec City	Quebec	63,090
4	Hamilton	Ontario	48,980
5	Ottawa	Ontario	44,154
6	Saint John	New Brunswick	39,179
7	Halifax	Nova Scotia	38,556
8	London	Ontario	31,977
9	Winnipeg	Manitoba	25,642
10	Kingston	Ontario	19,264

== 1901 ==
Vancouver, British Columbia, becomes the second city in Western Canada to appear on the Top 10 list, cutting Ontario from five spots on the list – on all three previous censuses – to four.

Rank	City	Province	Population
1	Montreal	Quebec	267,730
2	Toronto	Ontario	208,040
3	Quebec City	Quebec	68,840
4	Ottawa	Ontario	59,928
5	Hamilton	Ontario	52,634
6	Winnipeg	Manitoba	42,340
7	Halifax	Nova Scotia	40,832
8	Saint John	New Brunswick	40,711
9	London	Ontario	37,981
10	Vancouver	British Columbia	26,133

== 1911 ==
Calgary, Alberta, becomes the third city in Western Canada to appear on the Top 10 list, cutting The Maritimes from two spots on the list – on the two most recent previous censuses – to one.

Rank	City	Province	Population
1	Montreal	Quebec	470,480
2	Toronto	Ontario	378,538
3	Winnipeg	Manitoba	136,035
4	Vancouver	British Columbia	100,401
5	Ottawa	Ontario	87,701
6	Hamilton	Ontario	81,969
7	Quebec City	Quebec	78,710
8	Halifax	Nova Scotia	46,619
9	London	Ontario	46,300
10	Calgary	Alberta	43,704

== 1921 ==
Edmonton, Alberta, becomes the fourth city in Western Canada to appear on the Top 10 list, removing all cities in The Maritimes from the list for the first time as of this sixth national census; The Maritimes have never again placed a city in the Top 10 list. Western Canada's four most populous cities – Vancouver, Calgary, Edmonton and Winnipeg – have remained in the Top 10 since 1921, joined briefly in 2001 (only) by Surrey, British Columbia.

Rank	City	Province	Population
1	Montreal	Quebec	618,506
2	Toronto	Ontario	521,893
3	Winnipeg	Manitoba	179,087
4	Vancouver	British Columbia	163,220
5	Hamilton	Ontario	114,151
6	Ottawa	Ontario	107,843
7	Quebec City	Quebec	95,193
8	Calgary	Alberta	63,305
9	London	Ontario	60,959
10	Edmonton	Alberta	58,821

== 1931 ==
Rank	City	Province	Population
1	Montreal	Quebec	818,517
2	Toronto	Ontario	631,207
3	Vancouver	British Columbia	246,593
4	Winnipeg	Manitoba	218,784
5	Hamilton	Ontario	155,547
6	Quebec City	Quebec	130,594
7	Ottawa	Ontario	126,872
8	Calgary	Alberta	83,761
9	Edmonton	Alberta	79,197
10	London	Ontario	71,148

== 1941 ==
The 1941 census introduced the concept of "Greater Cities", the precursor of census metropolitan areas (CMA) that would be formally implemented in the next census. Greater cities were defined as cities having well-defined satellite communities which were outside the boundaries of the formal border of the incorporated municipal entities, but were in close economic or geographical relationship" to the city.

The 1941 census listed twelves such metropolitan areas and provide population statistics for them: Halifax (NS), Saint John (NB), Montréal, Québec (QC), Hamilton, London, Ottawa, Toronto, Windsor (ON), Winnipeg (MB), Vancouver, and Victoria (BC); and specifically noted that Calgary and Edmonton as large cities not organized in this manner. The 1941 census did not formally assign population ranking to the greater cities. (Only the 5th, 6th, and 7th ranked cities would have been affected.) The two set of population figures enable more meaningfully comparable comparison between the major population centres without strict conformance to the municipal borders.

Rank	City	Province	Population	
Rank	City	Province	Incorporated city	Greater city
1	Montreal	Quebec	903,007	1,139,921
2	Toronto	Ontario	667,567	990,491
3	Vancouver	British Columbia	275,353	351,491
4	Winnipeg	Manitoba	221,960	290,540
5	Hamilton	Ontario	166,337	176,110
6	Ottawa	Ontario	154,951	215,022
7	Quebec City	Quebec	150,757	200,814
8	Windsor	Ontario	105,311	121,112
9	Edmonton	Alberta	93,817	93,817
10	Calgary	Alberta	88,904	88,904

== 1951 ==
Montreal becomes the first city to hit over 1 million in population.

Rank	City	Province	Population	
Rank	City	Province	Incorporated city	CMA
1	Montreal	Quebec	1,021,520	1,395,400
2	Toronto	Ontario	675,754	1,117,470
3	Vancouver	British Columbia	344,843	530,728
4	Winnipeg	Manitoba	235,710	354,069
5	Hamilton	Ontario	208,321	259,685
6	Ottawa	Ontario	202,045	281,908
7	Quebec City	Quebec	164,016	274,827
8	Edmonton	Alberta	159,631	173,075
9	Calgary	Alberta	129,060	139,105
10	Windsor	Ontario	120,040	157,672

== 1956 ==
Rank	City	Province	Population	
Rank	City	Province	Incorporated city	CMA
1	Montreal	Quebec	1,109,439	1,620,758
2	Toronto	Ontario	667,706	1,358,028
3	Vancouver	British Columbia	364,844	665,017
4	Winnipeg	Manitoba	255,093	409,121
5	Hamilton	Ontario	239,625	327,831
6	Edmonton	Alberta	226,002	251,004
7	Ottawa	Ontario	222,129	345,460
8	Calgary	Alberta	181,780	200,449
9	Quebec City	Quebec	170,703	309,959
10	Windsor	Ontario	121,980	185,865

== 1961 ==
Rank	City	Province	Population
1	Montreal	Quebec	1,191,062
2	Toronto	Ontario	672,407
3	Vancouver	British Columbia	384,522
4	Edmonton	Alberta	281,022
5	Hamilton	Ontario	273,991
6	Ottawa	Ontario	268,206
7	Winnipeg	Manitoba	265,429
8	Calgary	Alberta	249,632
9	Quebec City	Quebec	171,979
10	London	Ontario	169,569

== 1966 ==
Rank	City	Province	Population
1	Montreal	Quebec	1,225,255
2	Toronto	Ontario	664,584
3	Vancouver	British Columbia	410,375
4	Edmonton	Alberta	376,925
5	Calgary	Alberta	330,575
6	Hamilton	Ontario	298,121
7	Ottawa	Ontario	290,741
8	Winnipeg	Manitoba	257,005
9	Laval	Quebec	196,088
10	London	Ontario	194,416

== 1971 ==
Rank	City	Province	Population
1	Montreal	Quebec	1,214,351
2	Toronto	Ontario	712,786
3	Edmonton	Alberta	438,152
4	Vancouver	British Columbia	426,256
5	Calgary	Alberta	403,319
6	Hamilton	Ontario	309,173
7	Ottawa	Ontario	302,241
8	Winnipeg	Manitoba	246,246
9	Laval	Quebec	228,010
10	London	Ontario	223,222

== 1976 ==
Rank	City	Province	Population
1	Montreal	Quebec	1,080,546
2	Toronto	Ontario	633,318
3	Winnipeg (Note: Winnipeg's population more than doubled from 1971, in large part to amalgamation of its surrounding municipalities.)	Manitoba	560,874
4	Calgary	Alberta	469,917
5	Edmonton	Alberta	461,361
6	Vancouver	British Columbia	410,188
7	Hamilton	Ontario	312,003
8	Ottawa	Ontario	304,462
9	Mississauga	Ontario	250,017
10	Laval	Quebec	246,243

== 1981 ==
After holding two spots on the Top 10 list in all 14 previous censuses, Quebec is reduced to one city on the list. It will briefly return to two positions, in 1996 (19th census) and 2006 (20th census).

Through the 1970s, while a number of Canadian cities suffered population losses, the three Canadian Prairies cities on the Top 10 list – Calgary, Edmonton and Winnipeg – saw significant growth: the two Alberta cities primarily through consistent net migration, with Winnipeg primarily boosted by amalgamation of its surrounding municipalities prior to the 1976 census.

Rank	City	Province	Population
1	Montreal	Quebec	980,354
2	Toronto	Ontario	599,217
3	Calgary	Alberta	592,743
4	Winnipeg	Manitoba	564,473
5	North York	Ontario	559,521
6	Edmonton	Alberta	532,246
7	Vancouver	British Columbia	414,281
8	Mississauga	Ontario	315,056
9	Hamilton	Ontario	306,434
10	Ottawa	Ontario	295,033

== 1986 ==
Rank	City	Province	Population
1	Montreal	Quebec	1,015,420
2	Calgary	Alberta	636,104
3	Toronto	Ontario	612,289
4	Winnipeg	Manitoba	594,551
5	Edmonton	Alberta	573,982
6	North York	Ontario	556,297
7	Scarborough	Ontario	484,676
8	Vancouver	British Columbia	431,147
9	Mississauga	Ontario	374,005
10	Hamilton	Ontario	306,728

== 1991 ==
Rank	City	Province	Population
1	Montreal	Quebec	1,017,666
2	Calgary	Alberta	710,677
3	Toronto	Ontario	635,395
4	Winnipeg	Manitoba	616,790
5	Edmonton	Alberta	616,741
6	North York	Ontario	563,270
7	Scarborough	Ontario	524,598
8	Vancouver	British Columbia	471,844
9	Mississauga	Ontario	463,388
10	Hamilton	Ontario	318,499

== 1996 ==
Rank	City	Province	Population
1	Montreal	Quebec	1,016,376
2	Calgary	Alberta	768,082
3	Toronto	Ontario	653,734
4	Winnipeg	Manitoba	618,477
5	Edmonton	Alberta	616,306
6	North York	Ontario	589,653
7	Scarborough	Ontario	558,960
8	Mississauga	Ontario	544,382
9	Vancouver	British Columbia	514,008
10	Laval	Quebec	330,393

== 2001 ==
Numerous amalgamations took place in Ontario during the 1990s and 2000s that affected city population figures.

A significant change is that, after holding the position of largest city in Canada on all 19 previous censuses, covering the first 129 years of the nation of Canada, Montreal drops to second place on the list, displaced by Toronto. These two cities have maintained the same top two positions on all subsequent censuses.

Rank	City	Province	Population
1	Toronto (Note: Toronto amalgamated with five surrounding municipalities on January 1, 1998.)	Ontario	2,481,494
2	Montreal	Quebec	1,039,534
3	Calgary	Alberta	879,003
4	Ottawa (Note: Ottawa amalgamated with 11 surrounding municipalities on January 1, 2001.)	Ontario	774,072
5	Edmonton	Alberta	666,104
6	Winnipeg	Manitoba	619,544
7	Mississauga	Ontario	612,000
8	Vancouver	British Columbia	545,671
9	Hamilton (Note: Hamilton amalgamated with six surrounding municipalities on January 1, 2001.)	Ontario	490,268
10	Surrey	British Columbia	347,825

== 2006 ==
A wave of amalgamations took place in Quebec since the previous census, affecting city population figures. In particular, in 2002, both Montreal and Quebec City combined with a number of smaller surrounding cities, though some later chose to leave the amalgamations.

Rank	City	Province	Population
1	Toronto	Ontario	2,503,281
2	Montreal	Quebec	1,620,693
3	Calgary	Alberta	988,193
4	Ottawa	Ontario	812,129
5	Edmonton	Alberta	730,372
6	Mississauga	Ontario	668,549
7	Winnipeg	Manitoba	633,451
8	Vancouver	British Columbia	578,041
9	Hamilton	Ontario	504,559
10	Quebec City	Quebec	491,452

== 2011 ==
Rank	City	Province	Population
1	Toronto	Ontario	2,615,060
2	Montreal	Quebec	1,649,519
3	Calgary	Alberta	1,096,833
4	Ottawa	Ontario	883,391
5	Edmonton	Alberta	821,201
6	Mississauga	Ontario	713,443
7	Winnipeg	Manitoba	663,617
8	Vancouver	British Columbia	603,502
9	Brampton	Ontario	523,911
10	Hamilton	Ontario	519,949

== 2016 ==
Rank	City	Province	Population	CMA Rank	CMA
1	Toronto	Ontario	2,731,571	1	5,928,040
2	Montreal	Quebec	1,704,694	2	4,104,074
3	Calgary	Alberta	1,239,220	4	1,392,609
4	Ottawa	Ontario	934,243	5	1,371,576
5	Edmonton	Alberta	932,546	6	1,321,441
6	Mississauga	Ontario	721,599	part of Toronto CMA	
7	Winnipeg	Manitoba	705,244	8	783,099
8	Vancouver	British Columbia	631,486	3	2,463,431
9	Brampton	Ontario	593,638	part of Toronto CMA	
10	Hamilton	Ontario	536,917	9	747,545

Quebec City with 531,902 resident within its formal municipal boundary ranked 11th, but the CMA with 798,162 would have ranked seventh.

Other than Quebec City, only three of the nine cities holding 12th to 20th rank are not part of a CMA in the above list:

- 14th rank Halifax, NS (ranked 13th as a CMA)
- 15th rank London, ON (ranked 11th as a CMA)
- 19th rank Saskatoon, SK (ranked 17th as a CMA)

Other than Quebec City, the one other top-10 CMA not featured in ten largest cities in 2016 was Kitchener-Cambridge-Waterloo, the cities in the "Tri-cities" combo individually held relatively modest ranks of 21st, 40th, and 51st.

== 2021 ==
Rank	City	Province	Population	CMA rank	CMA
1	Toronto	Ontario	2,794,356	1	6,202,225
2	Montreal	Quebec	1,762,949	2	4,291,732
3	Calgary	Alberta	1,306,784	5	1,481,806
4	Ottawa	Ontario	1,017,449	4	1,488,307
5	Edmonton	Alberta	1,010,899	6	1,418,118
6	Winnipeg	Manitoba	749,607	8	834,678
7	Mississauga	Ontario	717,961	part of Toronto CMA	
8	Vancouver	British Columbia	662,248	3	2,642,825
9	Brampton	Ontario	656,480	part of Toronto CMA	
10	Hamilton	Ontario	569,353	9	785,184

== See also ==
- Census in Canada
- List of the largest cities and towns in Canada by area
- List of the largest municipalities in Canada by population
- List of the largest population centres in Canada
- Population of Canada by province and territory
- Population of Canada by year
