= Ville =

French word and English suffix

Ville is a French word meaning "city" or "town", but its meaning in the Middle Ages was "farm" (from Gallo-Romance VILLA < Latin villa rustica) and then "village". The derivative suffix -ville is commonly used in names of cities, towns and villages, particularly throughout France, Canada and the United States.

== Usage in France ==
Communes of France ending with -ville

In France, after the 6th Century, especially in the North, first of all Normandy (20% of the communes end with -ville), Beauce and French speaking part of Lorraine. In the Southeast, they are exceptional and modern. In the Southwest, -ville is very often a translation of the Occitan -viala (Gascon -viela), sometimes ill gallicized in -vielle (variant -fielle). There are almost all combined with the landowner's name. f. e : Colleville, Normandy, with Colle- that represents the Old Norse personal name Koli. The oldest recorded example of a -ville place-name in Normandy is Bourville as Bodardi villa in 715. Other rates indicate that there are only 1 068 -ville communes out of 36 591 communes in France (if we exclude the -viale, -viel[l]e, -fielle variant forms of the Southwest), but 460 out of 1 068 are located in Normandy (more than 1/3) for a total number of 3 332 communes in Normandy (36 591 in France).

In England, after the Norman Conquest in 1066, some names of individuals gained -ville endings, but not many place names did, Bournville in Birmingham that came to use in the late 19th century was more for standing out than historic. These names are however still a reference to places, either in Normandy or elsewhere in France, such as Carville found as a last name in Yorkshire or Dunstanville found as a last name in Kent (cf. the placename Dénestanville, spelled Dunestanvilla in the 11th century).

== Usage in Canada ==
Although a ville in the predominantly francophone Canadian province of Quebec may be informally referred to as a "city" or a "town" in English, no distinction exists under provincial law between those two types of settlements. The "city" of Montreal, with a population of 1,762,949 in the 2021 Canadian census, and the "town" of Barkmere, with a population of just 81, are both legally villes.

Quebec does have several other types of municipal status, including municipalities, townships and villages, but any distinction between cities and towns in English has no basis in law and no objective criteria to differentiate between the two. However, in villes with a large anglophone population, there may be an established—albeit informal—preference. For instance, Mount Royal is nearly always referred to as a town—as opposed to a city—by its anglophone populace, while places such as Montreal, Quebec City, Trois-Rivières, Sherbrooke, Saguenay and Gatineau are virtually always referred to as cities.

Cité is a defunct title that currently is used only officially by Dorval, which is nevertheless legally a ville.

In all other Canadian provinces, although ville is still used as the French translation for both "city" and "town", cities and towns there do have distinct legal status from each other.

In New Brunswick, Canada's only constitutionally bilingual province, ville is commonly used to refer to both cities and towns; however, the official translation of city in provincial law is cité.

As in the United States, -ville may also be a suffix that is part of a city's or a town's actual name. This usage exists in both English and French; examples include Oakville, Brockville and Belleville in Ontario, Blainville, Drummondville, Victoriaville and Louiseville in Quebec, Wolfville in Nova Scotia and Parksville in British Columbia. In Quebec, it may also be used as a prefix, as in Ville-Marie or Villeroy.

Ville, as a suffix or prefix within a geographic name, may also sometimes denote an unincorporated neighbourhood within a larger city, such as Ville-Émard, Davisville, Unionville, or Africville.

There are also places named after people, such as Villeray.

== Usage in the United States ==
According to toponymist George R. Stewart, the use of the suffix -ville for settlements in the United States did not begin until after the American Revolution. Previously, town-names did not usually use suffixes unless named after European towns in which case the name was borrowed wholly. When a suffix was needed, -town (or the separate word Town) was typically added (as in Charleston, South Carolina, originally Charles Town). In the middle of the 18th century, the suffixes -borough (-boro) and -burgh (-burg) came into style. The use of -town (-ton) also increased, in part due to the increasing use of personal names for new settlements. Thus the settlement founded by William Trent became known as Trenton. These three suffixes, -town/-ton, -borough/-boro, and -burgh/-burg became popular before the Revolution, while -ville was almost completely unused until afterward. Its post-revolutionary popularity, along with the decline in the use of -town, was due in part to the pro-French sentiments which spread through the country after the war. The founding of Louisville, Kentucky, in 1780, for example, used not only the French suffix but the name of the French king, Louis XVI. The popularity of -ville was greatest in the southern and western (Appalachian) regions of the new country, as opposed to its lesser prevalence in New England.

A few -ville names pre-date the revolution, but most of them are named after persons whose name refers to European settlements or dukedoms. For example, Granville, Massachusetts was named for the Earl of Granville (he was named himself after Granville, Manche (Normandy)). After the revolution and the decline in the use of -borough and -town, the two suffixes -ville and -burgh/-burg became by far the most popular for many decades. A difference between the usage of the two is that -burgh/-burg was almost always appended to personal names while -ville was added to a variety of words.

By the middle of the 19th century, the -ville suffix began to lose its popularity, with -wood, -hurst, -mere, -dale, and others becoming common. However, the -ville suffix is still associated with the name of settlements in language use and popular culture.

=== -ville in popular culture ===
- Thneedville, the setting of the movie The Lorax
- Antville, an underground city in the animation Anthony Ant
- Coolsville, the setting of the Scooby-Doo cartoon franchise
- Danville, the setting of the American animated TV series Phineas and Ferb
- Dogville, a 2003 drama film
- FarmVille, a 2009 farming video game
- Friendlyville, the main setting in the children’s television series, Finley the Fire Engine
- Hooterville, the setting of the American TV series Petticoat Junction and Green Acres
- Hooverville, an area where homeless people generally lived during the Great Depression
- Pleasantville, a 1998 American feature film
- Psychoville a British television series
- Retroville, the setting of the American animated TV series The Adventures of Jimmy Neutron: Boy Genius
- Smallville, a town in the Superman comics and related media
- Shelbyville, a fictional city in the American animated TV series The Simpsons
- Stylesville, the setting of the American animated TV series Bratz
- Townsville, the setting of the American animated TV series The Powerpuff Girls
- Whoville, a fictional town created by author Theodor Seuss Geisel, under the name Dr. Seuss
- Whyville, an educational website targeted at children
