= Language demographics of Quebec =

This article presents the current language demographics of the Canadian province of Quebec.

== Demographic terms ==
The complex nature of Quebec's linguistic situation, with individuals who are often bilingual or multilingual, requires the use of multiple terms in order to describe the languages which people speak.

Francophone
Speaking French as a first language.
Anglophone
Speaking English as a first language.
Allophone
Having a mother tongue other than English or French.
Mother tongue
The first language learned by a person, which may or may not still be used by that individual in adulthood, is a basic measure of a population's language. However, with the high number of mixed francophone-anglophone marriages and the reality of multilingualism in Montreal, this description does not give a true linguistic portrait of Quebec. It is, however, still essential, for example in order to calculate the assimilation rate. Statistics Canada defines mother tongue as the first language learned in childhood and still spoken; it does not presuppose literacy in that or any language.
Home language
This is the language most often spoken at home and is currently preferred to identify francophones, anglophones, and allophones. This descriptor has the advantage of pointing out the current usage of languages. However, it fails to describe the language that is most used at work, which may be different.
Knowledge of official languages
This measure describes which of the two official languages of Canada a person can speak informally. This relies on the person's own evaluation of his/her linguistic competence and can prove misleading.
First official language learned
Measures whether English or French are the first of the two official languages learned; it places allophones into English or French linguistic communities.
Official language minority
Based on first official language learned, but placing half of the people equally proficient since childhood in both English and French into each linguistic community; it is used by the Canadian government to determine the demand for minority language services in a region

== Current demographics ==
=== Knowledge of languages ===
Top languages known in Quebec 2021 census (Note: The question on knowledge of languages allows for multiple responses. The following figures are from the 2021 Canadian census.)
| Language | Percent |
| French | 93.72% |
| English | 51.96% |
| Spanish | 5.46% |
| Arabic | 4.14% |
| Italian | 2.02% |
| Creoles | 1.63% |
| Chinese (Note: Including total responses to all Chinese languages and dialects.) | 1.29% |
| Portuguese | 0.79% |
| German (Note: Including total responses to all High German languages.) | 0.70% |
| Hindustani (Note: Including total responses to Hindi–Urdu.) | 0.69% |

The question on knowledge of languages allows for multiple responses, and first appeared on the 1991 Canadian census. (Note: The 1991 Census was the first to ask Canadians whether they could conduct a conversation in a language other than English or French.)

Knowledge of Languages in Quebec (1991–2021)
| Language | 2021 Canadian census | | 2016 Canadian census | | 2011 Canadian census | | 2006 Canadian census | | 2001 Canadian census | | 1996 Canadian census | | 1991 Canadian census | |
| Language | Pop. | % | Pop. | % | Pop. | % | Pop. | % | Pop. | % | Pop. | % | Pop. | % |
|---|---|---|---|---|---|---|---|---|---|---|---|---|---|---|
| French | 7,786,740 | 93.72% | 7,522,350 | 94.44% | 7,375,900 | 94.37% | 7,028,740 | 94.52% | 6,739,050 | 94.58% | 6,612,305 | 93.86% | 6,371,920 | 93.56% |
| English | 4,317,180 | 51.96% | 3,930,690 | 49.35% | 3,692,585 | 47.24% | 3,354,650 | 45.11% | 3,234,745 | 45.4% | 3,019,100 | 42.85% | 2,786,745 | 40.92% |
| Spanish | 453,905 | 5.46% | 390,355 | 4.9% | 348,920 | 4.46% | 291,010 | 3.91% | 231,315 | 3.25% | 190,990 | 2.71% | 145,665 | 2.14% |
| Arabic | 343,680 | 4.14% | 267,965 | 3.36% | 211,825 | 2.71% | 157,025 | 2.11% | 115,785 | 1.62% | 91,770 | 1.3% | 74,680 | 1.1% |
| Italian | 168,040 | 2.02% | 173,710 | 2.18% | 177,890 | 2.28% | 191,340 | 2.57% | 188,925 | 2.65% | 192,595 | 2.73% | 190,430 | 2.8% |
| Creoles | 135,275 | 1.63% | 115,445 | 1.45% | 99,045 | 1.27% | 78,230 | 1.05% | 62,910 | 0.88% | 59,340 | 0.84% | 42,780 | 0.63% |
| Chinese | 106,915 | 1.29% | 90,060 | 1.13% | 80,025 | 1.02% | 73,550 | 0.99% | 52,565 | 0.74% | 46,390 | 0.66% | 36,555 | 0.54% |
| Portuguese | 65,605 | 0.79% | 55,100 | 0.69% | 47,640 | 0.61% | 46,795 | 0.63% | 45,450 | 0.64% | 42,765 | 0.61% | 42,565 | 0.63% |
| German | 57,855 | 0.7% | 56,120 | 0.7% | 58,785 | 0.75% | 61,460 | 0.83% | 66,745 | 0.94% | 72,040 | 1.02% | 76,725 | 1.13% |
| Hindustani | 56,945 | 0.69% | 32,115 | 0.4% | 27,475 | 0.35% | 28,440 | 0.38% | 22,100 | 0.31% | 17,620 | 0.25% | 11,860 | 0.17% |
| Russian | 55,485 | 0.67% | 46,665 | 0.59% | 39,015 | 0.5% | 29,925 | 0.4% | 22,285 | 0.31% | 17,595 | 0.25% | 10,800 | 0.16% |
| Greek | 50,370 | 0.61% | 51,060 | 0.64% | 53,020 | 0.68% | 52,490 | 0.71% | 52,050 | 0.73% | 53,035 | 0.75% | 54,575 | 0.8% |
| Persian (Note: Including total responses to all Persian Language dialects.) | 44,745 | 0.54% | 32,965 | 0.41% | 22,825 | 0.29% | 16,950 | 0.23% | 13,160 | 0.18% | 10,515 | 0.15% | 8,020 | 0.12% |
| Romanian | 44,515 | 0.54% | 42,655 | 0.54% | 33,690 | 0.43% | 30,375 | 0.41% | 15,155 | 0.21% | 12,935 | 0.18% | 8,615 | 0.13% |
| Vietnamese | 37,650 | 0.45% | 34,580 | 0.43% | 37,370 | 0.48% | 32,775 | 0.44% | 28,755 | 0.4% | 28,835 | 0.41% | 24,115 | 0.35% |
| Algonquian (Note: Including total responses to all Algonquian languages: Cree–Innu, Mi'kmaq, Ojibway–Potawatomi, and others.) | 35,985 | 0.43% | 37,515 | 0.47% | 34,555 | 0.44% | 33,280 | 0.45% | 29,265 | 0.41% | 27,255 | 0.39% | 22,245 | 0.33% |
| Punjabi | 34,290 | 0.41% | 17,860 | 0.22% | 14,480 | 0.19% | 15,435 | 0.21% | 13,050 | 0.18% | 9,155 | 0.13% | 4,850 | 0.07% |
| Tagalog | 33,810 | 0.41% | 26,705 | 0.34% | 25,320 | 0.32% | 19,400 | 0.26% | 15,140 | 0.21% | 12,430 | 0.18% | 8,585 | 0.13% |
| Armenian | 22,095 | 0.27% | 20,290 | 0.25% | 18,645 | 0.24% | 18,540 | 0.25% | 16,960 | 0.24% | 17,215 | 0.24% | 16,840 | 0.25% |
| Tamil | 20,050 | 0.24% | 17,245 | 0.22% | 19,460 | 0.25% | 13,965 | 0.19% | 13,180 | 0.18% | 9,440 | 0.13% | 5,315 | 0.08% |
| Hebrew | 19,210 | 0.23% | 18,035 | 0.23% | 19,150 | 0.25% | 18,835 | 0.25% | 18,225 | 0.26% | 19,510 | 0.28% | 17,200 | 0.25% |
| Polish | 16,790 | 0.2% | 17,760 | 0.22% | 18,365 | 0.23% | 20,945 | 0.28% | 22,330 | 0.31% | 24,325 | 0.35% | 25,755 | 0.38% |
| Inuit–Inuktut–Inuktitut | 13,905 | 0.17% | 12,595 | 0.16% | 12,550 | 0.16% | 10,415 | 0.14% | 9,255 | 0.13% | 8,525 | 0.12% | 7,525 | 0.11% |
| Serbo-Croatian | 11,145 | 0.13% | 11,990 | 0.15% | 10,415 | 0.13% | 11,605 | 0.16% | 9,595 | 0.13% | 8,085 | 0.11% | 2,950 | 0.04% |
| Gujarati | 10,645 | 0.13% | 7,950 | 0.1% | 7,485 | 0.1% | 7,155 | 0.1% | 7,005 | 0.1% | 5,455 | 0.08% | 4,040 | 0.06% |
| Ukrainian | 10,185 | 0.12% | 9,015 | 0.11% | 6,780 | 0.09% | 7,900 | 0.11% | 8,180 | 0.11% | 9,360 | 0.13% | 9,180 | 0.13% |
| Japanese | 9,300 | 0.11% | 7,040 | 0.09% | 6,135 | 0.08% | 4,625 | 0.06% | 3,630 | 0.05% | 3,610 | 0.05% | 2,720 | 0.04% |
| Korean | 9,265 | 0.11% | 6,260 | 0.08% | 5,365 | 0.07% | 4,290 | 0.06% | 3,285 | 0.05% | 3,145 | 0.04% | 2,420 | 0.04% |
| Hungarian | 6,850 | 0.08% | 7,215 | 0.09% | 8,230 | 0.11% | 9,730 | 0.13% | 9,805 | 0.14% | 11,460 | 0.16% | 12,400 | 0.18% |
| Dutch | 5,175 | 0.06% | 5,060 | 0.06% | 5,475 | 0.07% | 5,555 | 0.07% | 5,590 | 0.08% | 5,750 | 0.08% | 5,960 | 0.09% |
| Scandinavian (Note: Total responses to all Scandinavian–North Germanic languages, including Danish, Icelandic, Norwegian, and Swedish.) | 3,340 | 0.04% | 3,065 | 0.04% | 3,120 | 0.04% | 3,000 | 0.04% | 3,200 | 0.04% | 2,700 | 0.04% | 2,920 | 0.04% |
| Total responses | 8,308,480 | 97.7% | 7,965,450 | 97.6% | 7,815,955 | 98.9% | 7,435,900 | 98.5% | 7,125,580 | 98.5% | 7,045,085 | 98.7% | 6,810,300 | 98.8% |
| Total population | 8,501,833 | 100% | 8,164,361 | 100% | 7,903,001 | 100% | 7,546,131 | 100% | 7,237,479 | 100% | 7,138,795 | 100% | 6,895,963 | 100% |

=== Overview as of the 2016 census ===
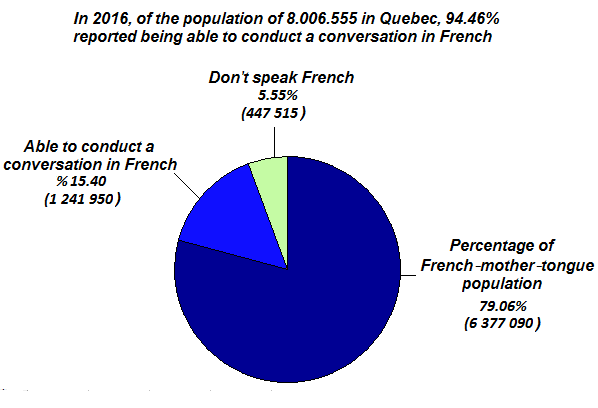
In Quebec, 94.5% of the population reported being able to conduct a conversation in French in 2016.

- Population: 8,164,361
- Official language: French
- Majority group: Francophone (77.1%)
- Minority groups: Allophone (13.15%), Anglophone (7.45%), Aboriginals (0.6%), native speakers of two languages or more (2.3%)

Among the ten provinces of Canada, Quebec is the only one whose majority is francophone. Quebec's population accounts for 23.9% of the Canadian population, and Quebec's francophones account for about 90% of Canada's French-speaking population.

English-speaking Quebecers are a large population in the Greater Montreal Area, where they have built a well-established network of educational, social, economic, and cultural institutions. There are also historical English-speaking communities in the Eastern Townships, the Ottawa Valley, the Laurentians (such as Ste. Agathe des Monts, Ste. Adolphe de Howard, Arundel, Lachute, Mont Tremblant) and the Gaspé Peninsula. By contrast, the population of Quebec City, the second-largest city in the province, is almost exclusively francophone. Overall in the province the proportion of native English speakers dropped significantly between 1951 and 2001, from 13.8% to 8% in 2001, while it has since stabilized.

The remaining 13% of the population, known as allophones, are native speakers of more than 30 different languages. With the exception of Aboriginal peoples in Quebec (the Inuit, Huron, Mohawks, Iroquois, Abenaki, Montagnais, Cree, Innu, Ojibway etc.), the majority are products of recent immigration and often come to adopt either English or French as home languages.

=== Numbers of native speakers ===
Of the population of 8,501,833 counted by the 2021 census, 8,406,905 completed the section about their first language. Of these, 8,098,355 gave singular responses. The languages most commonly reported were the following:

| Language | Number of native speakers | Percentage of singular responses |
|---|---|---|
| Total | 8,098,355 | 100.0% |
| French | 6,291,445 | 77.69% |
| English | 639,365 | 7.89% |
| Arabic | 198,790 | 2.45% |
| Spanish | 177,155 | 2.19% |
| Italian | 90,940 | 1.12% |
| Mandarin | 57,445 | 0.71% |
| Kabyle | 57,135 | 0.70% |
| Haitian Creole | 46,470 | 0.57% |
| Portuguese | 41,540 | 0.51% |
| Romanian | 35,810 | 0.44% |
| Greek | 34,085 | 0.42% |
| Russian | 31,700 | 0.39% |
| Vietnamese | 28,630 | 0.35% |
| Cree-Innu languages | 27,875 | 0.34% |
| Yue (Cantonese) | 24,240 | 0.30% |
| Punjabi (Panjabi) | 23,830 | 0.29% |
| Iranian Persian | 22,130 | 0.27% |
| Tagalog (Pilipino, Filipino) | 17,705 | 0.22% |
| Armenian | 16,890 | 0.21% |
| Tamil | 14,230 | 0.18% |
| Other Creole languages | 13,055 | 0.16% |
| Inuktut (Inuit) | 12,770 | 0.16% |
| Polish | 12,495 | 0.15% |
| Bengali | 12,140 | 0.15% |
| Other Niger-Congo languages | 11,905 | 0.15% |
| Urdu | 11,325 | 0.14% |
| German | 11,055 | 0.14% |
| Dari | 10,665 | 0.13% |
| Yiddish | 8,985 | 0.11% |
| Khmer (Cambodian) | 8,730 | 0.11% |
| Turkish | 8,215 | 0.10% |
| Gujarati | 7,070 | 0.09% |
| Bulgarian | 6,735 | 0.08% |
| Korean | 6,670 | 0.08% |
| Other Austronesian languages | 5,735 | 0.07% |
| Hindi | 5,440 | 0.07% |
| Ukrainian | 5,065 | 0.06% |
| Hungarian | 4,865 | 0.06% |
| Rundi (Kirundi) | 4,585 | 0.06% |
| Other Dravidian languages | 4,120 | 0.05% |
| Swahili | 3,980 | 0.05% |
| Wolof | 3,945 | 0.05% |
| Lao | 3,815 | 0.05% |
| Serbian | 3,720 | 0.05% |
| Hebrew | 3,675 | 0.05% |
| Kinyarwanda (Rwanda) | 3,425 | 0.04% |
| Other Slavic languages | 3,405 | 0.04% |
| Albanian | 3,310 | 0.04% |
| Other Indo-Aryan languages | 3,220 | 0.04% |
| Morisyen | 3,110 | 0.04% |
| Lingala | 2,975 | 0.04% |
| Other Germanic languages | 2,955 | 0.04% |
| Other Persian languages | 2,820 | 0.03% |
| Other Chinese languages | 2,805 | 0.03% |
| Other Iranian languages | 2,775 | 0.03% |
| Japanese | 2,765 | 0.03% |
| Fulah (Pular, Pulaar, Fulfulde) | 2,670 | 0.03% |
| Min Nan (Chaochow, Teochow, Fukien, Taiwanese) | 2,665 | 0.03% |
| Other Indo-European languages | 2,660 | 0.03% |
| Other Afro-Asiatic languages | 2,630 | 0.03% |
| Dutch | 2,590 | 0.03% |
| Croatian | 2,380 | 0.03% |
| Other Berber languages | 2,270 | 0.03% |
| Other Semitic languages | 2,130 | 0.03% |
| Ilocano | 2,125 | 0.03% |
| Bosnian | 2,070 | 0.03% |

Numerous other languages were also counted, but only languages with more than 2,000 native speakers are shown.
"Other" groupings include listed languages with less than 2,000 native speakers as well as entries listed as "not otherwise specified" or "not included elsewhere".
(Percentages shown are the ratio between the number of singular responses and the number of total responses.)

Mother tongue language
Canada census mother tongue – Province of Québec
| Census | Total | French | | | English | | | French & English | | | Other | | |
| Year | Responses | Count | Trend | Pop % | Count | Trend | Pop % | Count | Trend | Pop % | Count | Trend | Pop % |
| 2021 | 8,406,905 | 6,291,440 | ▲1.15% | 74.84% | 639,365 | ▲6.32% | 7.61% | 126,405 | ▲74.60% | 1.50% | 1,167,550 | ▲10.09% | 13.88% |
| 2016 | 8,066,560 | 6,219,665 | ▲1.92% | 77.10% | 601,155 | ▲0.33% | 7.45% | 72,395 | ▲1.74% | 0.89% | 1,060,030 | ▲10.22% | 13.14% |
| 2011 | 7,815,950 | 6,102,210 | ▲3.82% | 78.07% | 599,225 | ▲4.17% | 7.67% | 71,555 | ▲65.12% | 0.91% | 961,700 | ▲2.34% | 12.29% |
| 2006 | 7,435,905 | 5,877,660 | ▲2.01% | 79.04% | 575,555 | ▲3.32% | 7.73% | 43,335 | ▼13.43% | 0.58% | 939,350 | ▲24.14% | 12.69% |
| 2001 | 7,125,580 | 5,761,765 | ▲1.07% | 80.85% | 557,040 | ▼5.01% | 7.81% | 50,060 | ▼1.04% | 0.71% | 756,710 | ▲15.07% | 10.61% |
| 1996 | 7,045,080 | 5,700,150 | n/a | 80.91% | 586,435 | n/a | 8.32% | 50,585 | n/a | 0.72% | 657,580 | n/a | 9.33% |

=== Cities ===
2011 mother tongue by census metropolitan areas (CMAs), census subdivisions (CSDs) or census divisions (CDs)
| City | Mother tongue(s) | | | |
| City | Only French | Only English | English & French | Other |
|---|---|---|---|---|
| Island of Montreal (CD) | 46.95% | 16.64% | 1.17% | 35.24% |
| City of Montreal (CSD) | 50.30% | 12.67% | 1.07% | 35.96% |
| Greater Montreal Area (CMA) | 63.27% | 11.62% | 1.07% | 24.04% |
| Quebec City (CMA) | 94.89% | 1.43% | 0.44% | 3.24% |
| Gatineau (CSD) | 77.25% | 11.04% | 1.68% | 10.04% |
| Sherbrooke (CMA) | 89.38% | 4.89% | 0.78% | 4.95% |
| Saguenay (CMA) | 98.25% | 0.78% | 0.24% | 0.73% |
| Trois-Rivières (CMA) | 96.54% | 1.11% | 0.39% | 1.96% |

All figures are rounded to 0.01%.

=== Montreal ===
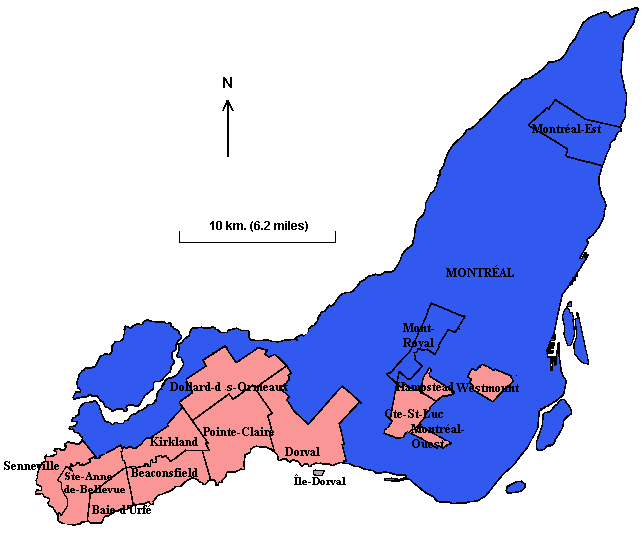
Language demographics of the municipalities of the Island of Montreal. In blue, the municipalities where the main language is French; in pink, the municipalities where the most used language is English

There are today three distinct territories in the Greater Montreal Area: the metropolitan region, Montreal Island, and Montreal, the city. (The island and the city were coterminous for a time between the municipal merger of 2002 and the "demerger" which occurred in January 2006.)

Quebec allophones account for 9% of the population of Quebec. The vast majority of them (88%) reside in Greater Montreal. Anglophones are also concentrated in the region of Montreal (80% of their numbers).

Francophones account for 65% of the total population of Greater Montreal, anglophones 12.6% and allophones 20.4%. On the island of Montreal, the francophone majority dropped to 46.96% by 2011, a net decline since the 1970s owing to francophone outmigration to more affluent suburbs in Laval and the South Shore (fr. Rive-Sud) and an influx of allophone immigrants. The anglophones account for 16.64% of the population and the allophones 35.24%.

=== Bilingualism ===
According to the 2016 census, the rate of bilingualism in English and French was 44.5 percent, a figure which continued to grow at a much faster rate in Quebec than in the rest of Canada. Bilingual speakers represented 42.6 percent in 2011, and 40.6 percent in 2006 (in 2016, it was 17.9 percent in Canada overall, up from just at 17.5 percent in 2011).

While 44.5 percent of the total population of Quebec reported being bilingual in 2016, this figure rose to 70 percent for those aged 14 to 17.

Almost 90 cities, towns or boroughs in Quebec are considered officially bilingual, a designation allowing them to offer services, post signage and mail communications in the country's two official languages.

=== Birth rate ===
At 1.74 children per woman, Quebec's 2008 fertility rate was above the Canada-wide rate of 1.59, and had increased for five consecutive years. However, it remained below the replacement fertility rate of 2.1. This contrasts with its fertility rates before 1960, which were among the highest of any industrialized society. Although Quebec is home to only 23.9% of the population of Canada, the number of international adoptions in Quebec is the highest of all provinces of Canada. In 2001, 42% of international adoptions in Canada were carried out in Quebec.

=== Immigration ===
In 2003, Quebec accepted some 37,619 immigrants. A large proportion of these immigrants originated from francophone countries and countries that are former French colonies. Countries from which significant numbers of people immigrate include Haiti, Congo, Lebanon, Morocco, Rwanda, Syria, Algeria, France and Belgium. Under the Canada-Quebec Accord, Quebec has sole responsibility for selecting most immigrants destined to the province (see related article, Immigration to Canada).

=== Interprovincial migration ===
Interprovincial migration between Quebec and other provinces and territories by mother tongue Source: Statistics Canada
| Mother Tongue / Year | 1971–1976 | 1976–1981 | 1981–1986 | 1986–1991 | 1991–1996 | 1996–2001 | Total |
|---|---|---|---|---|---|---|---|
| French | −4,100 | −18,000 | −12,900 | 5,200 | 1,200 | −8,900 | −37,500 |
| English | −52,200 | −106,300 | −41,600 | −22,200 | −24,500 | −29,200 | −276,000 |
| Other | −5,700 | −17,400 | −8,700 | −8,600 | −14,100 | −19,100 | −73,600 |

Interprovincial migration, especially to Ontario, results in a net loss of population in Quebec. The numbers of French-speaking Quebecers leaving the province tend to be similar to the number entering, while immigrants to Quebec are more likely to leave. Outmigration has most affected the English-speaking minority in Quebec, accounting for its population being significantly reduced since the 1970s.

== Legislation ==
- 1988 – Official Languages Act (federal)
- 1982 – Articles 14, 16–23, 55 and 57 of the Constitution Act, 1982 (federal)
- 1977 – Charter of the French Language (provincial)
- 1974 – Official Language Act (provincial)
- 1969 – An Act to promote the French language in Quebec (provincial)
- 1969 – Official Languages Act (federal)

There are two sets of language laws in Quebec, which overlap and in various areas conflict or compete with each other: the laws passed by the Parliament of Canada and the laws passed by the National Assembly of Quebec.

Since 1982, both parliaments have had to comply with the Charter of Rights and Freedoms, which constitutionalized a number of fundamental human rights and educational rights of minorities in all provinces (education is a provincial jurisdiction in Canada). Prior to this, Quebec was effectively the sole province required constitutionally to finance the educational needs of its linguistic minority. Ontario and Quebec are both required to finance schools for their principal religious minorities (Roman Catholic in Ontario, Protestant in Quebec), but only in Quebec is the minority almost completely composed of speakers of the minority language. (Quebec also provided English schools for anglophone Roman Catholics.) In 1997, an amendment to the constitution allowed for Quebec to replace its system of denominational school boards with a system of linguistic school boards.

The federal language law and regulations seek to make it possible for all Canadian anglophone and francophone citizens to obtain services in the language of their choice from the federal government. Ottawa promotes the adoption of bilingualism by the population and especially among the employees in the public service.

In contrast, the Quebec language law and regulations promote French exclusively as the common public language of all Quebecers. Although Quebec currently respects most of the constitutional rights of its anglophone minority, it took a series of court challenges to enforce. The government of Quebec promotes the adoption and the use of French and limits the presence of English. This is to counteract the trend towards the anglicization of the population of Quebec.

In May 2022, The CAQ Quebec government of François Legault passed Bill 96, with 78 MNAs in favour (from the CAQ and Québec solidaire) and 29 against (from the Liberal Party and Parti Québécois). The bill strengthens the 1970s Charter of the French Language. In that same year, François Legault caused controversy when he said that Quebec risked being a Louisiana (which used to be French speaking but is no longer) if Quebec doesn't have more control over immigration policy.

=== Anglicization and Francization ===
(see: Language contact, Stratum (linguistics), Linguistic description, Sociolinguistics)

The following table shows summary data on the language shifts which have occurred in Quebec between 1971, year of the first Canadian census asking questions about home language, and 2001 :

1971–2001
| Language | Speakers according to | | Linguistic persistence and attraction | Linguistic vitality indicator |
| Language | Mother language | Home language | Linguistic persistence and attraction | Linguistic vitality indicator |
|---|---|---|---|---|
| French | 5,787,012 | 5,897,610 | 110,598 | 1.019 |
| English | 582,564 | 733,643 | 151,079 | 1.259 |
| Others | 681,224 | 419,548 | -261,676 | 0.616 |

The second column starting on the left shows the number of native speakers of each language, the third shows the number of speakers using it at home.

The fourth column shows the difference between the number of speakers according to home language and those who speak it as mother tongue.

The fifth column shows the quotient of the division between the number of home language speakers and the native speakers.

Until the 1960s, the francophone majority of Quebec had only very weak assimilation power and, indeed, did not seek to assimilate non-francophones. Although some non-francophones adopted French throughout history, the pressure and, indeed, consensus from French-language and English-language institutions was historically towards the anglicization, not francization, of allophones in Quebec. Only a high fertility rate allowed the francophone population to keep increasing in absolute numbers in spite of assimilation and emigration. In the early 1960s, with the rise of irreligion, the fertility rate of the Quebecois began declining in a manner consistent with most developed societies, and some in Quebec's francophone majority feared the beginning of a demographic collapse: unlike the anglophone sphere, the francophone sphere was not assimilating allophones, and lower fertility rates were therefore much more determinative.

Quebec's language legislation has tried to address this since the 1960s when, as part of the Quiet Revolution, French Canadians chose to move away from Church domination and towards a stronger identification with state institutions as development instruments for their community. Instead of repelling non-Catholic immigrants from the French-language public school system and towards the Protestant-run English system, for instance, immigrants would now be encouraged to attend French-language schools. The ultimate quantifiable goal of Quebec's language policy is to establish French as Quebec's common public language.

Recent census data show that goal has not been reached as successfully as hoped. After almost 30 years of enforcement of the Charter of the French Language, approximately 49% of allophone immigrants – including those who arrived before the Charter's adoption in 1977 – had assimilated to English, down from 71% in 1971, but still considerably more than anglophones' overall share of the province's population. This leads some Quebecers, particularly those who support the continued role of French as the province's common public language, to question whether the policy is being implemented successfully. The phenomenon is linked to the linguistic environments which cohabit Montreal – Quebec's largest city, Canada's second-largest metropolitan area, and home to a number of communities, neighbourhoods, and even municipalities in which English is the de facto common language. The anglophone minority's capacity to assimilate allophones and even francophones has therefore compensated to a large extent for the outmigration of anglophones to other provinces and even to the United States.

A number of socio-economic factors are thought to be responsible for this reality. They include: the historic role of the English language in Canada and the U.S.; its growing influence in the business and scientific world; the perceived advantages of learning English that result from this prominence and which are particularly appealing to allophones who have yet to make a linguistic commitment; the historic association of English with immigrant Quebecers and French with ethnic French-Canadian Québécois, which plays into linguistic and identity politics; and the post-industrial clustering of anglophones into Montreal and away from regional communities. These factors go not only to allophone immigrants' direct linguistic assimilation, but also their indirect assimilation through contact with the private sector. Although the Charter of the French language makes French the official language of the workplace, the socio-economic factors cited here also often make English a requirement for employment, especially in Montreal, and to a lesser extent outside of it, notably in Canada's National Capital Region, bordering Ontario, and in the Eastern Townships, particularly Sherbrooke.

The result is a largely bilingual workforce. Francophones are often compelled to learn English to find employment (particularly in the Montreal area), while anglophones in the province are pressured to do the same with French, and allophones are asked to learn both. Census data adjusted for education and professional experience show that bilingual francophones had a greater income than bilingual anglophones by the year 2000.

In 2001, 29% of Quebec workers declared using English, either solely (193,320), mostly (293,320), equally with French (212,545) or regularly (857,420). The proportion rose to 37% in the Montreal metropolitan area, where bilingualism is common. Outside Montreal, on the other hand, the proportion of anglophones has shrunk to 3% of the population and, except on the Ontario and U.S. borders, struggles to maintain a critical mass to support educational and health institutions – a reality that only immigrants and francophones usually experience in the other provinces. Unilingual anglophones are however still on the decline because of the higher English-French bilingualism of the community's younger generations.

Not all analysts are entirely comfortable with this picture of the status of the English language in Quebec. For example, a more refined analysis of the Census data shows that a great deal of anglicization continues to occur in the communities traditionally associated with the English-language group, e.g., the Chinese, Italian, Greek and Indo-Pakistani groups. Nevertheless, a majority of new immigrants in every census since 1971 have chosen French more often than English as their adopted language. Statistics Canada's 2011 National Household Survey of Canada reported that for the first time in modern history, the first official language of more than half of Quebec immigrants was French. Those who spoke French as their first official language formed 51.1% of all immigrants to the province, while an additional 16.3% spoke both French and English; among those who immigrated to the province between 2006 and 2011, the proportion who spoke French as their first official language was 58.8%.

== See also ==
- Aboriginal peoples in Quebec
- Bilingualism in Canada
- Charter of the French Language
- Children of Bill 101
- Constitution of Canada
- Demographics of Quebec
- English-speaking Quebecer
- French-speaking Quebecer
- Language in Canada
- Cahiers québécois de démographie academic journal

== Bibliography ==
=== General studies ===
- Marmen, Louise and Corbeil, Jean-Pierre (2004). Languages in Canada 2001 Census, New Canadian Perspectives Series, Canadian Heritage, ISBN 0-662-68526-1

=== Language shifts ===
- Lisée, Jean-François (2004). Conference: The French fact in Québec and Canada: The Hidden Storm, American University Summer Institute, Washington D.C.
- O'Keefe, Michael (2001). Francophone Minorities: Assimilation and Community Vitality, 2nd Edition, New Canadian Perspectives Series, Canadian Heritage, ISBN 0-662-64786-6
- O'Keefe, Michael (1999). Francophone Minorities: Assimilation and Community Vitality, 1st Edition, New Canadian Perspectives Series, Canadian Heritage
- Castonguay, Charles (1999). "French is on the ropes. Why won't Ottawa admit it ?", in Policy Options / Options politiques, 20, 8 : 39-50
- Castonguay, Charles (1999). "Getting the facts straight on French : Reflections following the 1996 Census", in Inroads Journal, volume 8, pages 57 to 77
- Castonguay, Charles. (1998). Transcript of a Standing Joint Committee on Official Languages hearing, recorded on April 28

=== In French ===
==== General studies ====
- Bouchard, Pierre, Castonguay, Charles, Langlois, Simon, Pagé, Michel and Vincent, Nadine (2005). Les caractéristiques linguistiques de la population du Québec; profil et tendances 1991–2001 (Fascicule 1), Office québécois de la langue française ISBN 2-550-44200-8

==== Language at work ====
- Moffet, Virginie (2006). Langue du travail : indicateurs relatifs à l’évolution de la population active et à l’utilisation des langues au travail en 2001, Office québécois de la langue française ISBN 2-550-46345-5
- Chénard, Claire and Van Shendel, Nicolas (2002). Travailler en français au Québec : les perceptions de travailleurs et de gestionnaires, Office québécois de la langue française

==== Language shifts ====
- Castonguay, Charles. "La force réelle du français au Québec", Le Devoir, 20 December 2005
- Castonguay, Charles (2005). Les indicateurs généraux de vitalité des langues au Québec : comparabilité et tendances 1971–2001 (Étude 1), Office québécois de la langue française 48 pages
- Castonguay, Charles. "Quelle est la force d'attraction réelle du français au Québec? Analyse critique de l'amélioration de la situation du français observée en 2001", Le Devoir, 10 December 2003
- Castonguay, Charles. Assimilation linguistique et remplacement des générations francophones et anglophones au Québec et au Canada dans Recherches sociographiques, 2002
- Castonguay, Charles (1999). Population history des minorités de langue officielle, Le Programme de contestation judiciaire du Canada, Conférence linguistique
- Castonguay, Charles (Fall 1992). "L'orientation linguistique des allophones à Montréal", in Cahiers québécois de démographie, volume 21, issue 2

==== Demolinguistic forecast ====
- Termote, Marc (2003). "La dynamique démolinguistique du Québec et de ses régions", in Piché, Victor and Le Bourdais, Céline (eds.), La démographie québécoise. Enjeux du XXIe siècle. Montréal, Les Presses de l'Université de Montréal, collection "Paramètres", pages 264–299
- Termote, Marc (2002). "L'évolution démolinguistique du Québec et du Canada", in La mise à jour des études originalement préparées pour la Commission sur l'avenir politique et constitutionnel du Québec. Rapport soumis au ministre délégué aux affaires intergouvernementales canadiennes. Volume 2, livre 2. Québec, Conseil exécutif, Bureau de coordination des études, pages 161–244
- Termote, Marc (1999). Perspectives démolinguistiques du Québec et de la région de Montréal à l'aube du XXIe siècle : implications pour le français langue d'usage public, Conseil de la langue française, Montréal, 15 September 1999

==== Aboriginal languages ====
- Maurais, Jacques, (ed.) (1992). Les langues autochtones du Québec, Collection : Dossiers, 35, Pages : xviii, 455. Conseil de la langue française
