= Hende =

Hende is a surname. Notable people with the surname include:

- Csaba Hende (born 1960), Hungarian politician
- John Hende (c. 1350 – 1418), English merchant and politician

== See also ==
- Marc Dal Hende (born 1990), Danish footballer
- Van den Hende, another surname
