= Villa Maria (school) =

Private Catholic high school in Montreal, Quebec, Canada

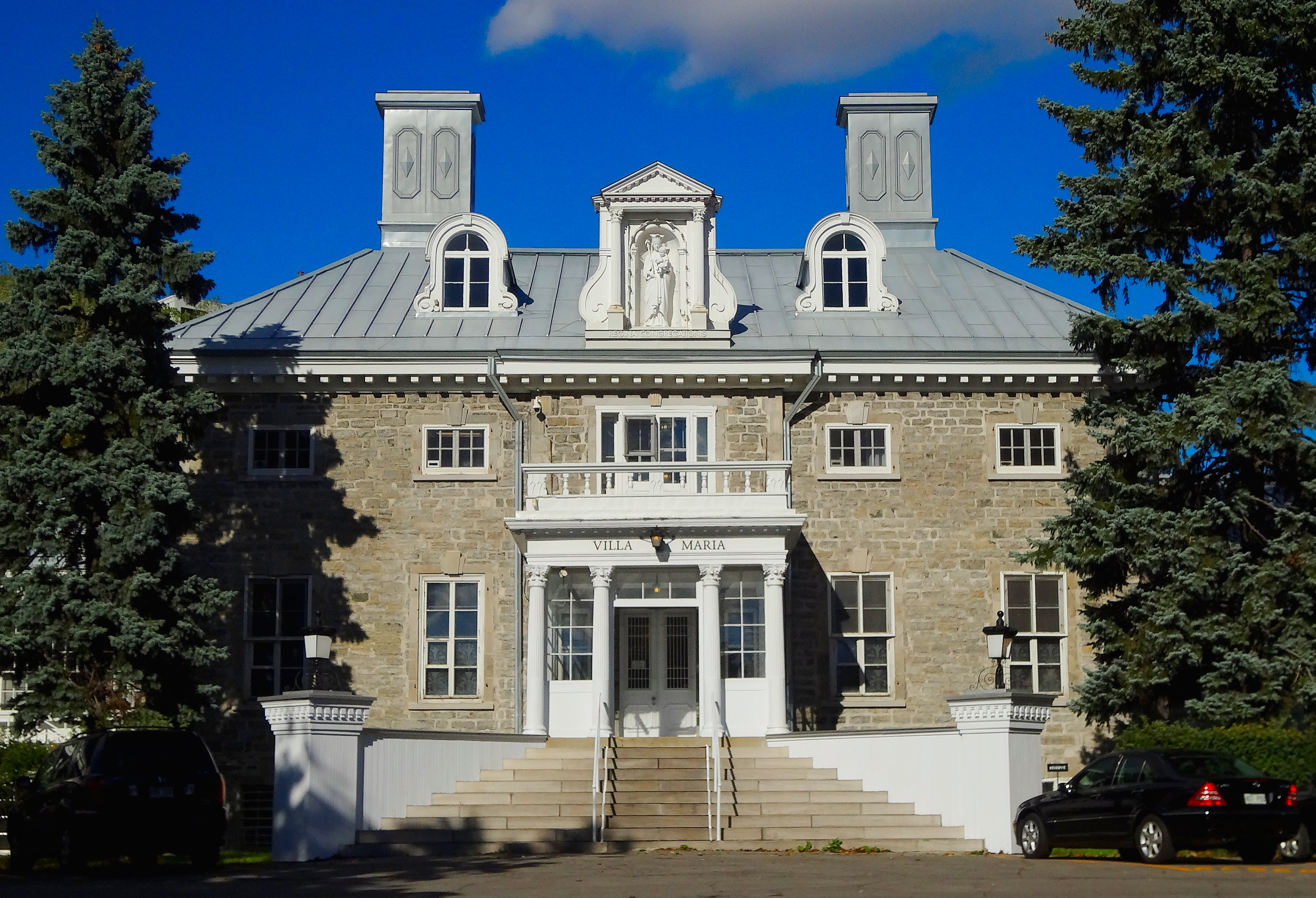
- 'Monklands', the central building of Villa Maria, built in 1804 for Sir James Monk

Location
- Montreal, Quebec; Canada; 45.48052°N 73.619975°W

Information
- Religious affiliation: Catholicism
- Established: 1854
- Founder: Congregation of Notre Dame of Montreal
- Grades: 7 to 11
- Gender: Originally girls only, now co-ed
- Age range: 12 to 17
- Enrollment: 1750
- Language: French and English
- Colors: Blue and yellow
- Website: http://www.villamaria.qc.ca/

Villa Maria is a subsidized private Catholic co-educational high school located in the Notre-Dame-de-Grâce neighbourhood of Montreal, Quebec, Canada, offering both francophone and anglophone streams. Founded in 1854 as a boarding school for girls, it stopped boarding students in 1966 and opened, in August 2016, to boys in the seventh grade. Today, there are roughly 950 students in the French sector and 800 students in the English sector with an average class size of 34 students. Tuition, as of the 2024–2025 school year, is $4,900 with $2,330 in extra mandatory fees. It ranked among the top 50 best high schools in Montreal, and is one of the largest private high schools on the Island.

The central part of the Villa Maria school is known as the Monklands Mansion and was the home of the governor general of Canada from 1844 to 1849. It is a National Historic Site of Canada. In 2023, the Congregation of Notre Dame of Montreal announced that the estate on which the school lies will be sold off, leaving the future of the school uncertain. The current lease ends in 2030, and the Congregation intends to put the land up for sale the following year. The Congregation cited the declining number of nuns as one of the reasons behind its decision to sell. While Villa Maria would like to purchase the real estate, negotiations have not been successful.

== Monklands ==
In 1795, James Monk, Chief Justice of Lower Canada, purchased an estate in Montreal that had previously belonged to the Décarie family. The first Monk residence, built in 1803, was the central section of the present-day Villa Maria.

Sir James Monk willed the property known as ‘Monklands’ to his niece, Elizabeth Ann Monk. In 1844, the family leased Monklands to the Crown as a residence for the Governor General of Canada. Modifications were made to create a more imposing residence.

Three Governors General—Sir Charles Metcalfe, Lord Cathcart, and Lord Elgin—resided at Monklands. When Elgin occupied the house, British extremists threatened to burn the structure down after Elgin signed a bill that helped those of the French whose homes had been burnt down during British raids by granting them money to reestablish themselves. However, because Lady Elgin was pregnant at the time, the rebels decided to burn down the parliament building in Montreal instead. Soon, Lady Elgin gave birth to a son, Victor Bruce, the future Viceroy of India, in a second floor room. While Montreal was serving as the capital of the Province of Canada (1844-49), Sebastien Compain turned Monklands into a country hotel.

Monklands is one of the oldest remaining Palladian-style villas in Canada. Because of its excellent state of conservation and the historic importance of its various occupants, it was declared a National Historic Site in 1951.

== School ==
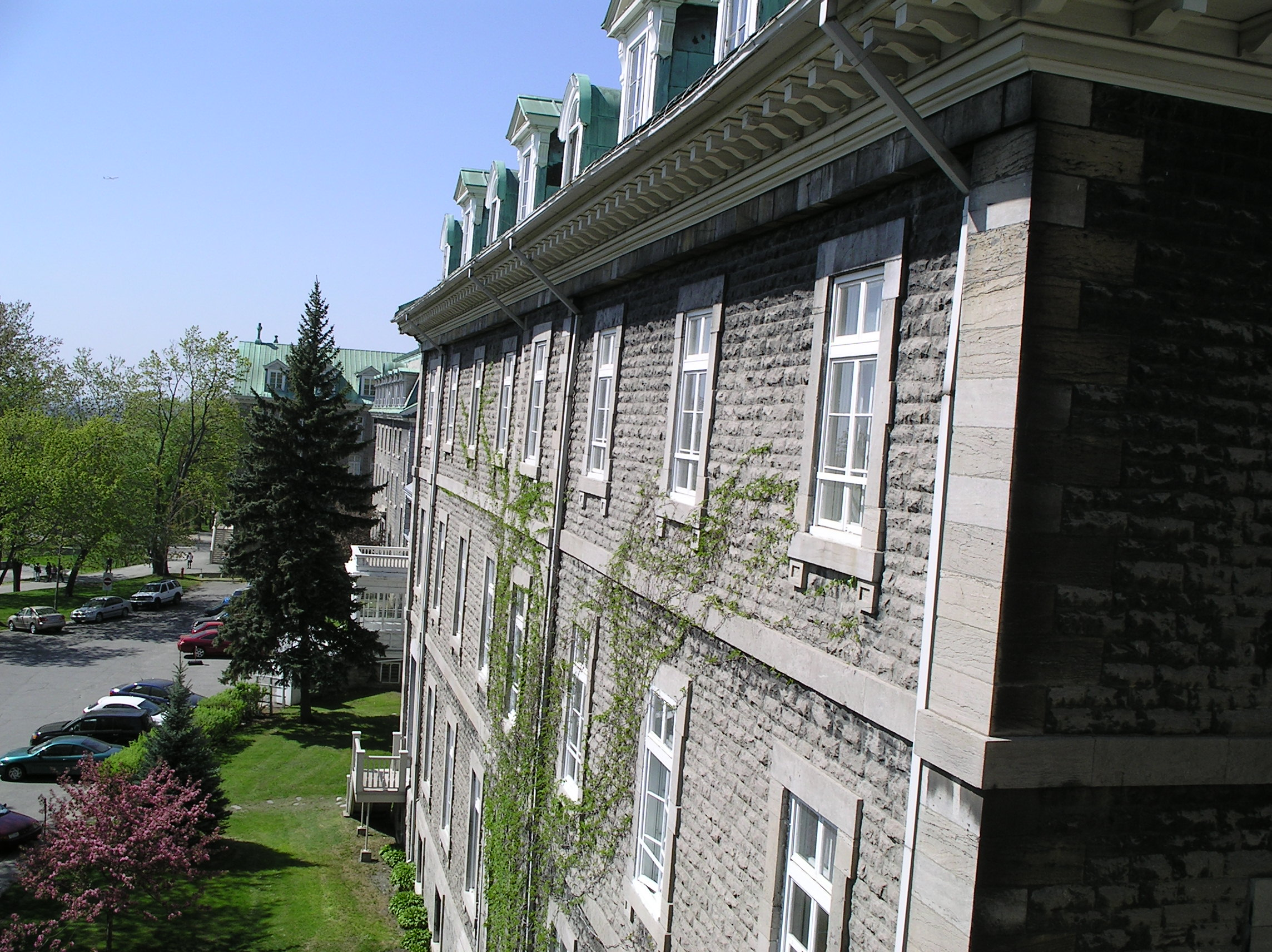
Villa Maria viewed from the St. Michel wing (wing A)

During the 1840s, the Congregation of Notre Dame of Montreal's teaching order faced overcrowded classrooms and began searching for a new place. The third phase of the building’s history thus began when the Congregation purchased the estate to open a boarding school. While Compain's business venture proved profitable, he agreed to give it up. Negotiations with the Monk family went smoothly. The Congregation decided to call their new school Villa Maria. It opened in 1854. By the end of September that year, enrollment reached 45 girls. Of these, all were boarders, and 18 came from outside of Montreal, including Boston. While the ratio of anglophone to francophone students has changed over the years, both cultural groups have remained honoured. At that time in history, Villa Maria was a leader in education in Montreal, and was visited by a number of dignitaries, starting with the future King Edward VII in 1860.

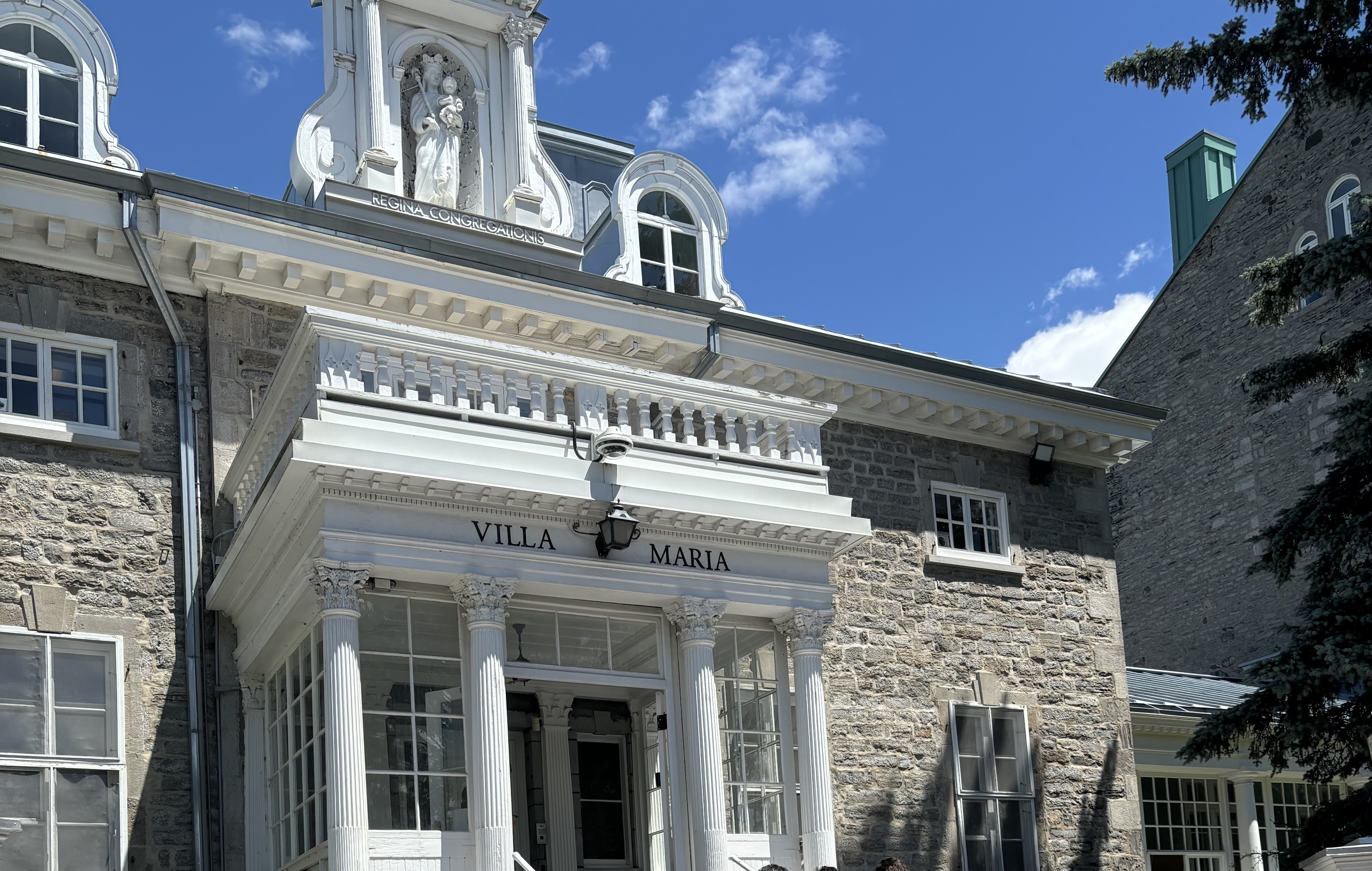
A close-up shot of Villa Maria's central building.

The school stopped boarding students in 1966 and now is a co-educational high school for children in Montreal and surrounding areas aged 12 to 17 (or Levels 1 to 5 according to Quebec Education levels, the equivalent of Grades 7 to 11). Between 2016 and 2020, the integration of boys was gradual, with current girls-only classes staying girls-only. This change was speculated to be a means of boosting enrollment, due to decreased numbers of eligible students entering the anglophone stream.

The school introduced 4 academic profiles that students can choose from in Grade 9. Students can pursue the Science profile, STEAM profile, Entrepreneurship and Leadership profile, or Law and International Studies profile. Each profile offers specialized courses that will help students develop skills and gain insights into their potential future career paths.

The Villa-Maria station of the Montreal Metro is named after the school.

== Notable students ==
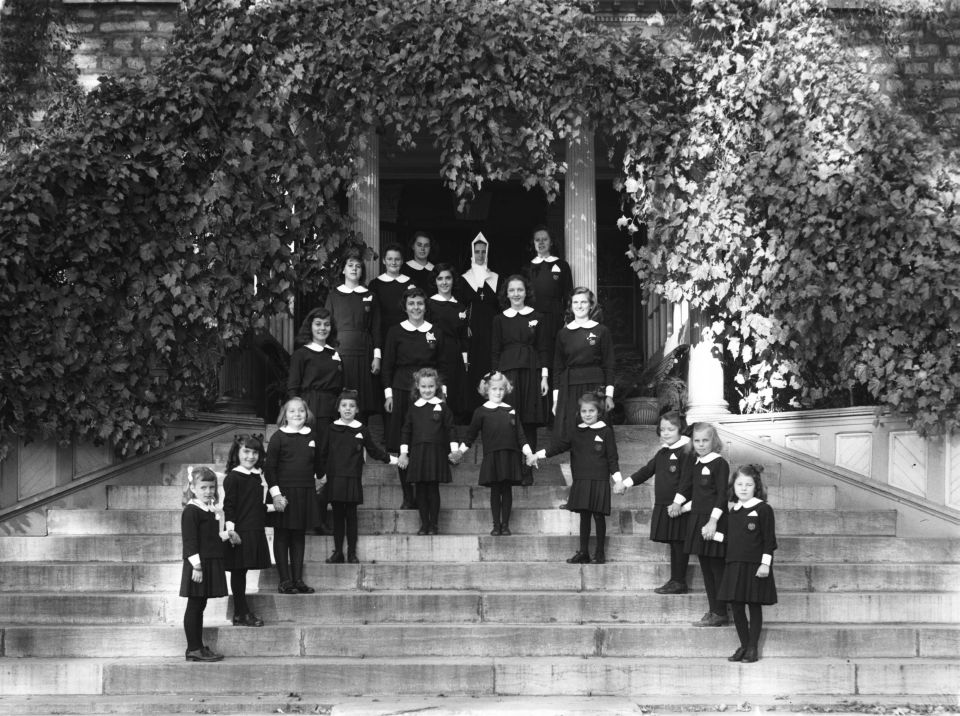
Students and nuns of the Congregation of Notre Dame of Montreal on the doorsteps of Villa Maria (1946)

- Pauline Fréchette (1889–1943; graduated, 1908), poet, dramatist, journalist, nun
- Veronica Lake, American actress
- Maybelle Stephens Mitchell, American suffragist
- Jessica Paré, actress
- Anna T. Sadlier (1854–1932), writer
- Celie Ellis Turner, American actress and playwright
- Françoise David, politician
