= Metropolitan College of Music =

Metropolitan College of Music can refer to:

- Metropolitan College of Music, New York, founded 1891, merged into American Institute of Applied Music in 1900
- Metropolitan College of Music, London, founded 1889, merged into London Academy of Music and Dramatic Art in 1904
- Metropolitan College of Music in Cincinnati, Ohio where Winthrop Smith Sterling was dean
