= Adrienne Remenyi von Ende =

Hungarian singer

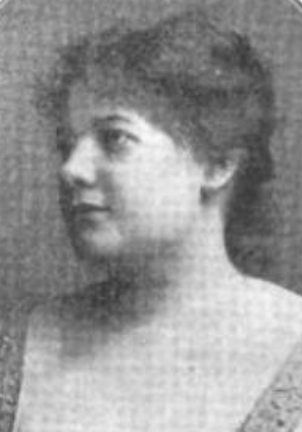
- Remenyi von Ende, from a 1915 publication
- Born: February 15, 1873; Budapest, Hungary
- Died: February 4, 1945 (aged 71); New York, New York, U.S.
- Other name: Adrianna Gizella Remenyi
- Occupations: Singer, voice teacher
- Parent: Ede Reményi
- Relatives: Amelia von Ende (mother-in-law)

Adrienne Gizella Remenyi von Ende (February 15, 1873 – February 4, 1945) was a Hungarian soprano singer and vocal teacher, based in New York City after 1900.

== Early life and education ==
Remenyi was born in Budapest, the daughter of Ede Reményi and Gizella Fáy. She had a twin brother, Tibor. Her father was a noted violinist. Her maternal grandfather was musician Fáy Antal, and her godfather was violinist Franz Liszt. She studied for a singing career with French vocalist Edmond Duvernoy.

== Career ==
Remenyi von Ende moved to the United States in 1893 with her parents, and in pursuit of a musical career as a soprano singer. She toured in the United States as a singer, with her father in 1894, and again in 1899 and 1900. She taught voice classes at the American Institute of Applied Music, at her husband's music school in New York City, and at the David Mannes Music School. She led a panel on vocal teaching at the first National Voice Study Convention in 1928. Her students included Rosamond Young Chapin and Mary Mellish.

== Personal life ==
In 1900, Remenyi married American violinist Herwegh von Ende, son of Polish-born writer and pianist Amelia von Ende. They had a daughter, Roxane. Her husband died from influenza in 1919; thereafter she shared a hotel suite with her former student, Ottilie Schillig. She survived a stroke in 1933, and died in 1945, at the age of 71, in New York City. Her grandson W. Leo Johnson was said to be the first American in England to enlist in the United States Army after Pearl Harbor.
