= Ida Branth =

American violinist

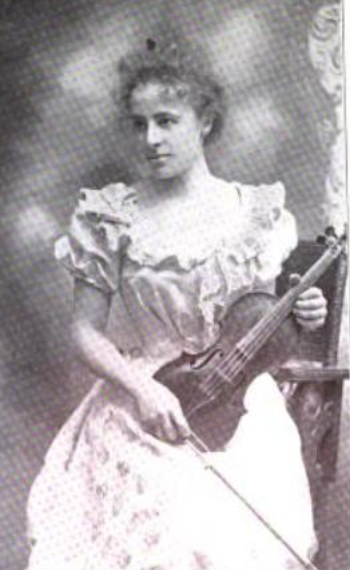
- Ida Branth, from a 1900 publication
- Born: August 30, 1871; Cincinnati, Ohio, U.S.
- Died: after 1939
- Other name: Ida Branth Burgy
- Occupation: Violinist

Ida Amalia W. Branth Burgy (August 30, 1871 – died after 1939) was an American violinist, violin teacher, and cyclist, based in New York City.

== Early life and education ==
Branth was born in Cincinnati, Ohio, and raised in New York City, the daughter of John Herman Branth and Therese Leineweber Branth. Her father was a physician and violinist born in Germany. Her parents divorced in 1886.

She received a gold medal when she graduated from high school in 1889. She studied violin at the Metropolitan College of Music, and with Czech violinist Karel Halíř in Berlin.

== Career ==
Branth performed at the Chicago World's Fair in 1893. She played at New York's Aeolian Hall and Carnegie Hall, toured in Europe, and taught violin. She toured in the United States with cellist Flavia Van den Hende and pianist Hilda Newman as the New York Ladies' Trio in 1900. She was a member of the Women's String Orchestra. "Her tone is clear and full and her execution remarkably facile," reported the Brooklyn Eagle in 1900. The Brooklyn Times-Union agreed, noting in 1900 that Branth "plays the violin gracefully, with good technique, ease of execution, clearness of tone, and style."

In 1902, Branth was head of the Branth Ladies' Quartette. In 1903, she was on the program of a concert in Brooklyn. In 1916 she played for a meeting of the Universal League, with her husband singing on the same program.

Branth was an enthusiastic bicyclist, rode long distances with her father, and wrote about riding in skirts. She was the only woman in New York known to have completed a century ride in 1894.

== Publications ==
- "Bloomers or Skirts?" (1895)

== Personal life ==
In 1902 Branth married tenor and landscape artist Frederick S. Burgy. They had a daughter, Florence.
