= Celie Ellis Turner =

Actress and playwright (1864/5 – 1924)

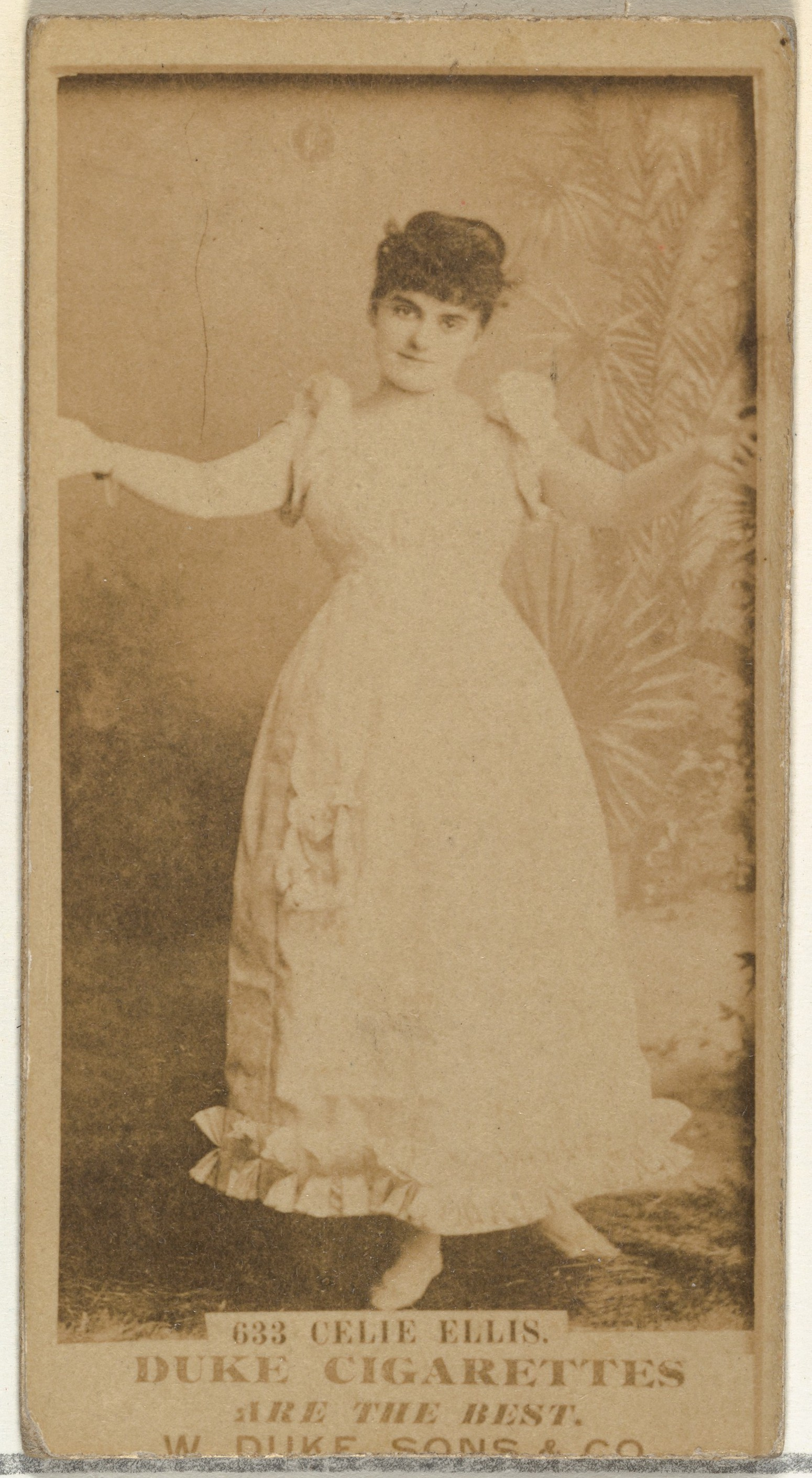
- Ellis c. 1880s
- Born: Celia Flanagan; 1864/1865; New York City, New York
- Died: October 2, 1924; New York City, New York
- Other names: Celie Ellis; Celie G. Turner; Cecilia Turner
- Occupations: Actress; Opera singer; Playwright
- Years active: 1886–1917

Celie Ellis Turner (born Celia Flanagan; 1864/1865 – October 2, 1924) was an American actress, singer, and playwright. Her early upbringing in a wealthy family included extensive musical education before she chose to join operatic and comic theatre. She transferred to multiple different stock companies during her career in the late 1800s, performing a number of major roles and having singing performances that exercised her talent as a soubrette.

== Life and career ==
She was born Celia Flanagan in 1864/1865 in New York City. She was one of eight children born to Richard R. Flannagan, a Tammany Hall politician, who was elected a Coroner of New York County from 1876 to 1879, and a wealthy mother related to Governor Horatio Seymour. She attended the Villa Maria school in Montreal, Canada, in her childhood and also learned music under Madame Kartel. She then went on to complete a post graduate musical course at the Metropolitan College of Music. She had conflicts with her family over pursuing a career on the stage, but still found success in the field. She became known as "the little mother" to those close to her because she helped raise her multiple siblings after the loss of their mother.

Choosing the stage name Celie Ellis, she was a part of comic opera and farce theatre performances from the 1880s through the 1890s, frequently seen in performances at Broadway's Casino Theatre. She also performed as a member of the McCaull Comic Opera Company in the 1880s before then acting as the soubrette for the Blue Jeans company. Ellis was noted by the Chicago Inter Ocean for her performance in The Black Hussar, especially her "piquant, saucy air" in her acting and her "pleasant singing voice" for the song "Ohe Mamma" that received several requests for encores.

Ellis married Henry S. Blake on November 15, 1887, and temporarily retired from theatre shortly afterwards, but returned in the middle of 1888 as a part of Heinrich Conried's English Opera Company and its performances at Uhrig's Cave. Joining the Duff Opera Company in 1889, she began taking roles playing as the ingénue character. She later joined as the leading lady of a stock company and was noted for being the long-term star of the 1892 play Dr. Bill in the United States. In 1894, Ellis moved stock companies again to join Eugene O'Rourke's The Wicklow Postman touring company. Several years after, in the early 1900s, she chose to leave acting and became a playwright. She died on October 2, 1924, at the reported age of 50 when she suffered a heart attack while visiting her theatrical manager's office to sell a new play she had written.

== Works ==
=== As performer ===
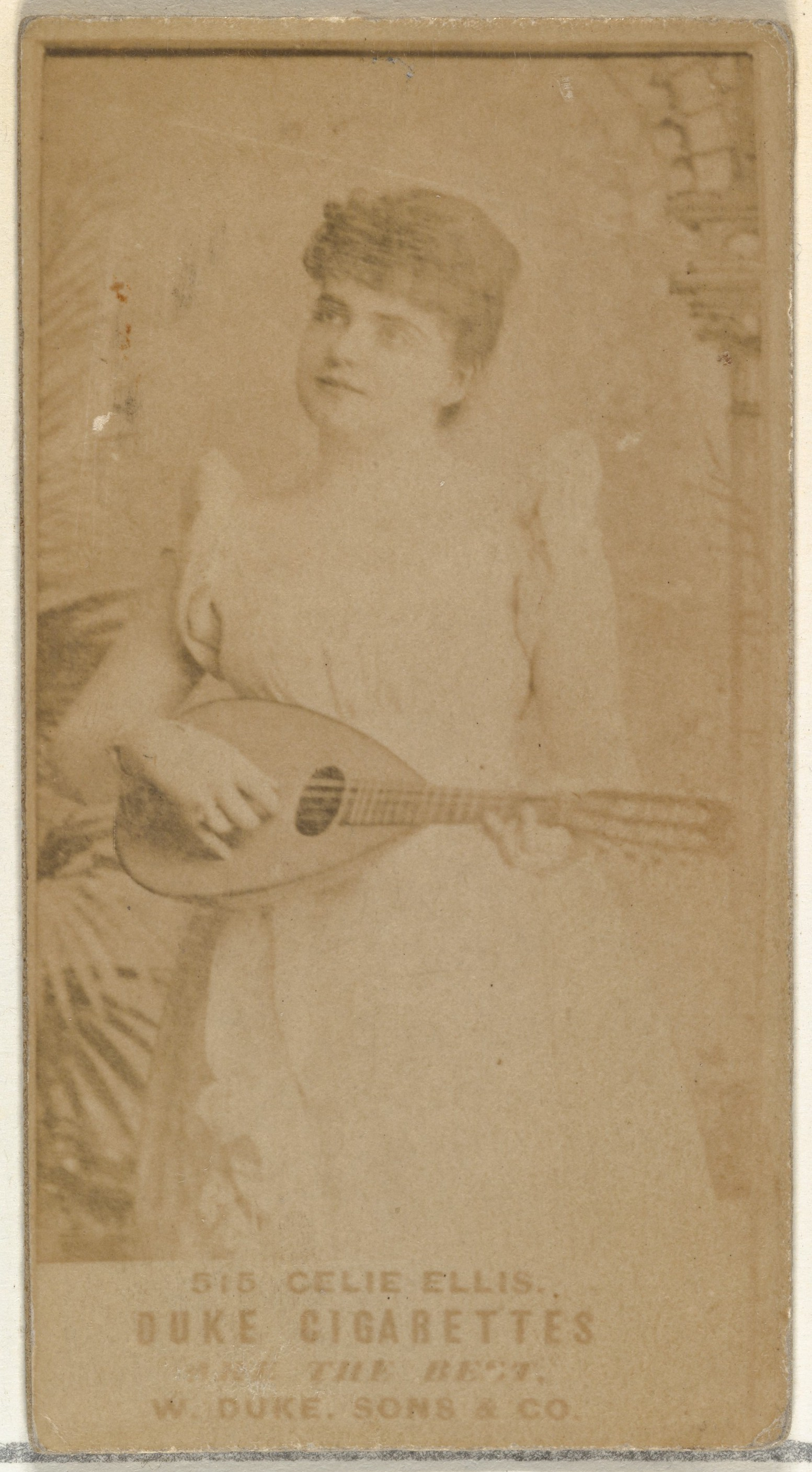
Duke Cigarettes photo card

- The Mikado (1886) as Pitti-Sing
- The Black Hussar (1886) as Rosetta
- The Arabian Nights (1887) as the Princess
- Jacquette (1888)
- Paola (1889) as Chilina
- The Gondoliers (1890) as Tessa
- The Brigands (1890)
- The Man About Town (1891)
- Dr. Bill (1892) as Mrs. Horton
- May Blossom (1893) as May Blossom
- H.M.S. Pinafore (1893) as Buttercup
- Yetiva (1895) as Yetiva
- A Night's Frolic (1896)

=== As playwright ===
- What the Ship Brought (1904)
- Society Island (1906)
- A Flower (1908)
- Who's Safe (1911)
- La Vespa (The Wasp) (1912)
- Equality of Men (1917)
