= Ede Reményi =

Hungarian violinist and composer

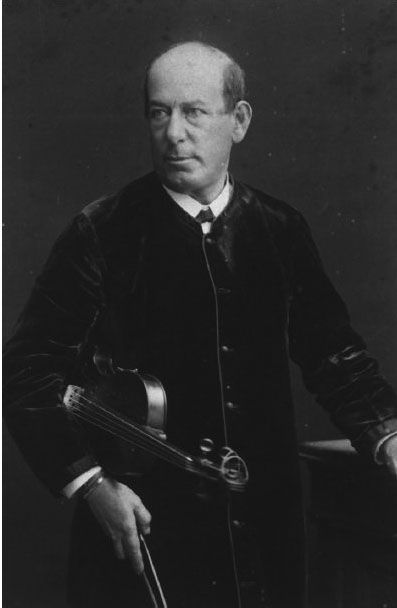
Ede Reményi in 1887

Ede Reményi or Eduard Reményi (January 17, 1828 Miskolc, Austrian Empire – May 15, 1898 San Francisco) was a Hungarian violinist and composer. His birth date is disputed, and variously given from 1828 to 1830.

== Biography ==
Reményi was born in Miskolc, Hungary, as Eduard Hoffmann. He studied under Joseph Böhm at the Vienna Conservatory from 1842 to 1845. Banished from Austria for participation in the Hungarian Revolution of 1848, he went to Germany, where he befriended the 15-year-old Johannes Brahms and introduced him to Hungarian music. Pursued by German authorities, he fled to the United States in December, 1849. He returned to Europe in 1852, toured with Brahms in 1853, and then sojourned for a time at Weimar, where he received the benefit of Franz Liszt's instruction and friendship. In 1854 he became solo violinist to Britain's Queen Victoria. He obtained his amnesty in 1860 and returned to Hungary, being soon afterward appointed soloist to Emperor Franz Joseph. He then retired for some years.

While born Eduard Hoffmann, he started using the name Ede Reményi by the time of the Revolutions of 1848, and his entire family followed suit sometime by 1862.

In 1865 he made a brilliant tour through France, Germany, Belgium, and Holland. From 1871 to 1877 he was in Paris, whence two years later he proceeded to London and then to the United States (where he took up residence), Canada, and Mexico. A concert tour round the world was undertaken by him in 1886, in the course of which he visited Japan, China, Cochinchina, and the Cape of Good Hope. He toured in the American South with his daughter Adrienne Remenyi von Ende in 1894.

He died during a concert he was giving in San Francisco in 1898, aged 70.

Reményi made numerous transcriptions of piano pieces such as Chopin's waltzes, polonaises, and mazurkas, and pieces by Bach, Schubert, and others, all of which were published under the title of Nouvelle École du Violon. Among his original compositions is a Violin Concerto.

== Gallery ==
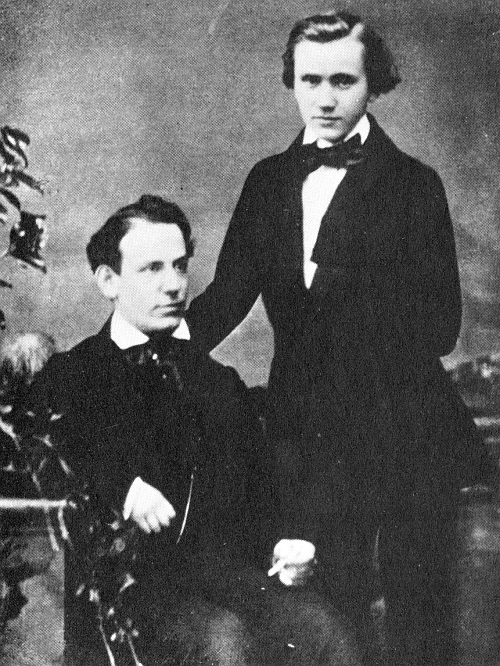
Ede Reményi and Johannes Brahms (1852)

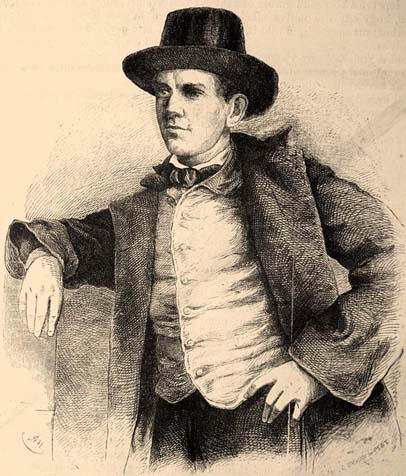
Ede Reményi (1856)

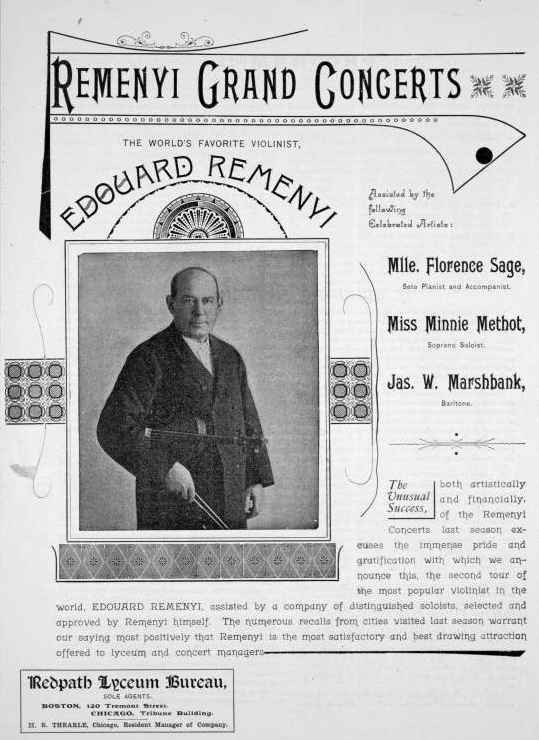
His concert program in Boston (1891)

== Bibliography ==
- Gwendolyn Dunlevy Kelley and George P. Upton, Edouard Remenyi Musician, Litterateur and Man, A. C. Mclurg, 1906
