= Dora Valesca Becker =

American musician (1870–1958)

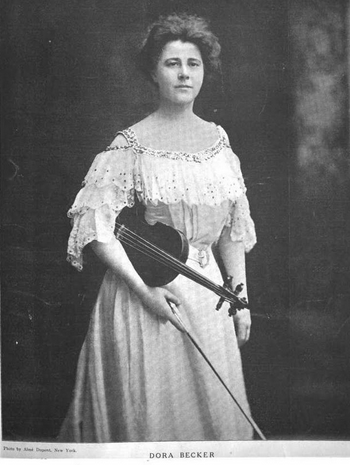
- Dora Valesca Becker, from a 1908 publication
- Born: March 7, 1870; Galveston, Texas
- Died: May 19, 1958 (aged 88); Pennsylvania
- Other names: Dora Valeska Becker, Dora V. Becker, Dora Becker Shaffer
- Occupation: Violinist

Dora Valesca Becker (March 7, 1870 – May 19, 1958) was an American violinist. In 1898, she became the first female violinist to play on a musical recording.

== Early life ==
Dora Valesca Becker was born in Galveston, Texas and raised in New York, the daughter of Francis Louis Becker and Maria Antonia Tekla Langhammer. Her father was conductor of the Galveston Singing Society, and her mother also had musical ambitions. She studied violin from an early age with Sam Franko and made her first appearance at Steinway Hall in 1880, aged 10 years. She studied with Joseph Joachim in Berlin as a young woman, on a Felix Mendelssohn scholarship.

Her brother Gustav Louis Becker (1861–1959) was a pianist, composer, and arranger.

== Career ==
Becker returned to the United States after making her debut with the Berlin Philharmonic in 1890, and began the New York Ladies' Trio with pianist Mabel Phipps and cellist Flavie Van den Hende. She became the first woman violinist to play on a musical recording in 1898, when she performed Henryk Wieniawski's "Mazurka Kujawiak" for a Bettini Phonograph Laboratory wax cylinder recording.

She mostly left the concert stage in 1899, except for occasional accompaniment appearances and recitals. She traveled and played in Europe in 1908. After marriage, she lectured and taught music in New York and New Jersey, and was a member of the New York State Teachers' Association, the Newark Musicians' Club, and the Newark Contemporary Club.

== Personal life ==
In 1899, Becker married organist Charles Grant Shaffer. She died in 1958, aged 88 years, in Pennsylvania.
