= Children of Bill 101 =

The children of Bill 101 (les enfants de la loi 101) is the name given to the generation of children whose parents immigrated to Quebec, Canada after the adoption of the 1977 Charter of the French Language (Bill 101).

One of the Charter's articles stipulates that all children under 16 must receive their primary and secondary education in French schools, unless one of the child's parents has received most of their education in English, in Canada, or the child or the child's sibling has already received a substantial part of their education in English, in Canada. If a child qualifies for a certificate of eligibility for instruction in English under one of those criteria, then the certificate is permanent and can be passed on to future generations even if the child ends up attending French instead of English school. The permanent certificate can only be granted if one of the child's parents is a Canadian citizen. In addition, children of foreign temporary residents living in Quebec on study or work permits, as well as children of diplomats, can also obtain a temporary certificate of eligibility that is only valid for the duration of their permit.

Mostly because of this, many of the children of Bill 101, already adults as of 2001, numbering between 93,800 and 100,600 individuals, have adopted French as their primary language of communication, and in a much greater proportion than the previous generations of immigrants, who had adopted English.

From the time Bill 101 was adopted until 2010, there existed a legal loophole for the children of francophones and allophones to attend public and subsidized private English schools if they went to an unsubsidized private English elementary school for at least one year. An estimated 11,000 children used this loophole between 1992 and 2002 to receive an English education in Quebec. In 2010, the provincial government introduced a more complicated point system under Bill 115 to replace the previous loophole, making it more difficult for the children of non-anglophones to attend any English school that received government funding. The bill required a student without anglophone parents to attend a minimum of three years in an unsubsidized private English elementary school before a certificate of eligibility required to attend government-funded English schools can be granted. The Quebec government does not provide any subsidies to private schools for elementary, so private English schools that took subsidies starting in grade 7 have always been able to accept students without certificates in kindergarten to grade 6 while requiring them in high school. However, since Bill 115 was passed, making it more difficult for children of non-anglophones to obtain a certificate in time for grade 7, some private English schools have decided to forego those subsidies so that they can admit students without certificates even in their high school section.

== Background ==
- Constitution Act 1867, Section 133

1867 marks the beginning of legislation regarding language inequality in Canada. This predecessor to Bill 101 was largely important for lawmakers and the provinces they represented. In this constitutional amendment, the Canadian legislature recognized the prevalence of francophones in the government. In response, Section 133 gave legislators the right to use French or English in Parliament and the courts at the federal level and in Quebec.

- 1960s

The 1960s brought an increased awareness in Canada of the problems that francophones in an English speaking country faced. Both culturally and linguistically, francophone Canadians experienced opposition and difficulty in all public arenas. In addition, French speakers at the time were economically underprivileged in Canada specifically when compared to English speakers. This held true even in Quebec, which held a majority of francophones. In an effort to improve the situation of French speakers, the Royal Commission of Bilingualism and Biculturalism (B & B Commission) was established in 1963 under the Lester B. Pearson Government. The establishment of this commission represented and promoted the cultural and linguistic composition of Canada for the first time. This commission confirmed inferior economic position of francophones in Canada. Owing in large part to the results of research and activism by this group, the Official Languages Act was passed in 1969. This act was passed under the government of Pierre Elliot Trudeau. With it, a Commissioner of Official Languages was deemed necessary in order to preserve and promote the rights of French speakers.

- Canadian Charter of Rights and Freedoms

After a decade of changes in language policy during the 1960s in Canada, francophones received even greater assistance in language rights in 1982. Part of the Constitution Act of 1982 gave constitutional status to language rights and guaranteed education rights to provincial minorities. The concept of education rights for minorities had been considered controversial in the past. With the introduction of this new Bill, however, the rights of provincial linguistic minorities were strengthened. This legislation applied to francophone communities in all but one case.

- Recent Legislation

The effects of multiple languages in one country still require legislation in Canada. The provincial and national governments must constantly work to accommodate changes in language and culture in Montreal and throughout Canada. In 2003, the Five Year Action Plan for Official Languages was established. This plan aimed to promote official languages from 2003 to 2008. The importance of language duality was recognized by officials as not only a part of the Canadian heritage but also as an asset for the future. Furthermore, this plan specified three specific areas of development. These three areas accommodated areas of specific concern for the francophone community: education, community development and public service.

== Effects of Bill 101 ==
The overall effects of Bill 101 are difficult to measure because of the nature of language learning. However, overall there has been a small increase in the percentage of francophones. Overall a fifty percent increase over 1970 of bilingual allophones has been noted. However, despite concerns that were present before the bill was enacted, there has been no discernible loss of English after the bill. Additionally, there has been no increase in job demand for allophones since the bill's enactment.

== See also ==
- Language demographics of Quebec
