= E. Jean Nelson Penfield =

American lawyer and author (1872–1961)

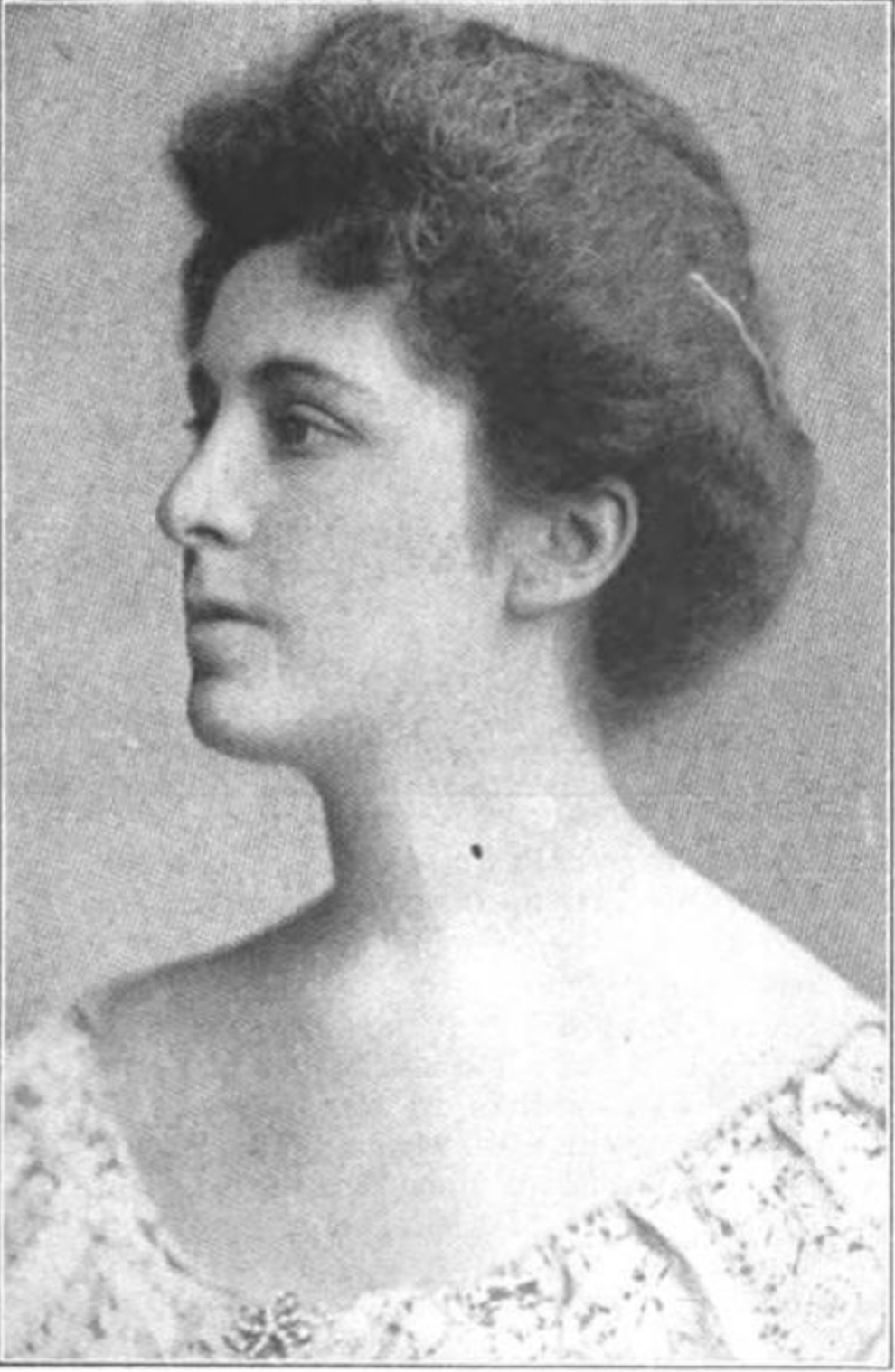
- Penfield in 1912
- Born: Eliza Jean Nelson; November 4, 1872; Greencastle, Indiana, U.S.
- Died: February 27, 1961 (aged 88); Indianapolis, Indiana, U.S.
- Occupations: lawyer; parliamentarian; lecturer; suffragist; author; poet
- Known for: National President, Kappa Kappa Gamma
- Notable work: Mother Mine

E. Jean Nelson Penfield (1872–1961) was an American lawyer, parliamentarian, lecturer, suffragist, author, and poet. In 1892, she was the winner of an interstate oratorical contest with 63 competing colleges from 11 states; till then, she was the only woman who had ever taken this honor. Penfield served as National President of the Kappa Kappa Gamma from 1900 to 1902. She co-founded the League of Women Voters, and was active in the organization of the woman's suffrage party, and the department of practical law for women in the Brooklyn Law School. She was also a director of the international committee on marriage and divorce.

== Early life and education ==
Eliza Jean Nelson was born at Greencastle, Indiana, November 4, 1872. Her parents were Franklin Perry and Eliza Jean (Brannan) Nelson.

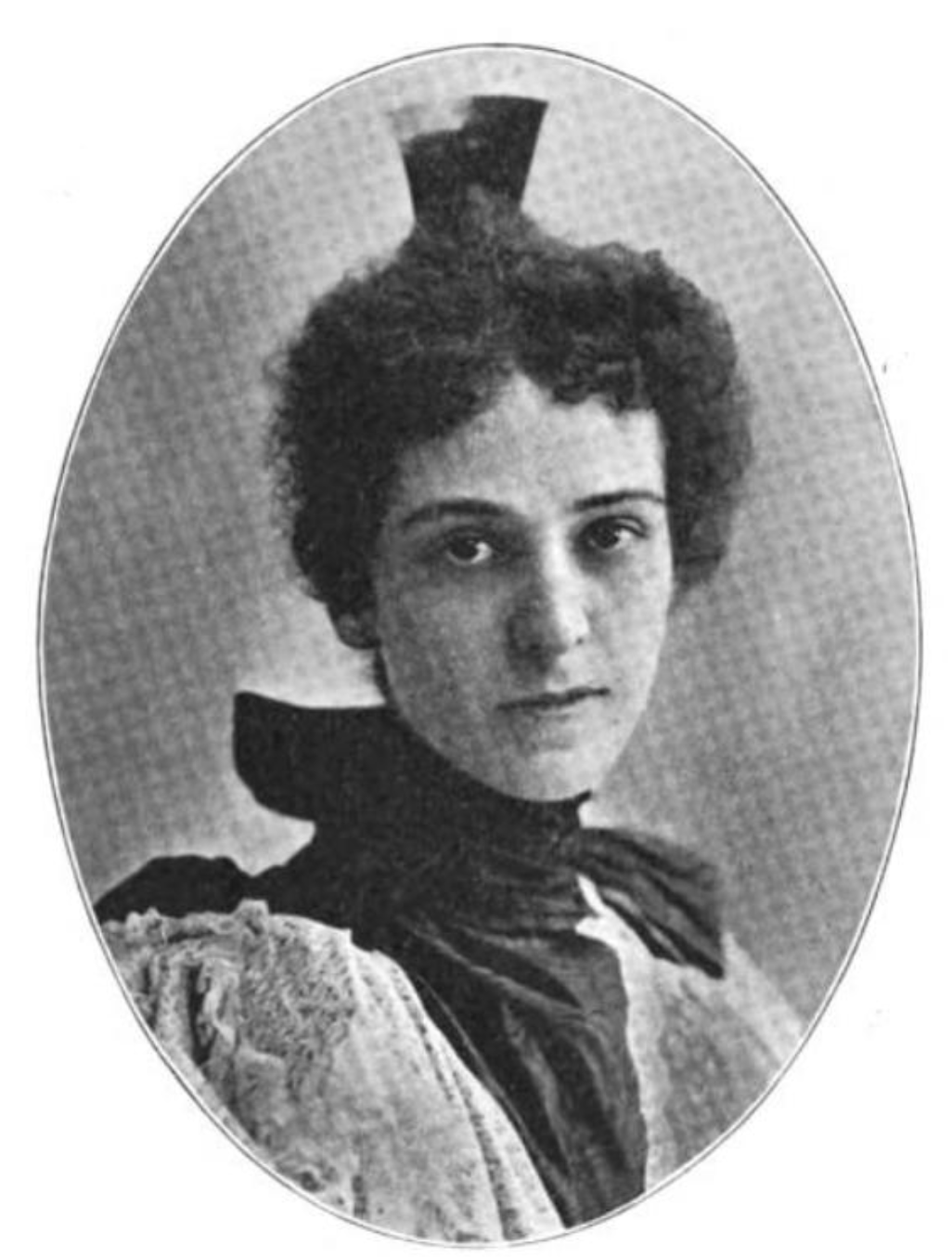
Penfield in 1907

She was educated at DePauw University (Ph.B., 1893). While there, she was conspicuous as a leader. For two years, she held editorial position upon the college paper (known as The Bema). She was also prominent in the literary, social and fraternity life of the college. In May 1892, while yet a junior, she won the interstate oratorical contest which was held at Minneapolis. In her day, she was the only woman in the history of the Iota Chapter, Kappa Kappa Gamma who has been awarded a first prize after graduation.

Nelson went to New York City for post-graduate work and to study vocal music, studying at the Metropolitan Conservatory of Music (1893–95), Sargent Dramatic School (1894–96), and with private masters.

== Career ==
In New York City, she founded the "Musical Aid Guild" for poor students of ability, which was afterwards absorbed by the Metropolitan Conservatory of Music. During this period, she also appeared upon the public lecture platform in advocacy of woman suffrage.

She married Judge William Warner Penfield in December 1897. They had two children, Jean Louise (d. 1898) and William Warner Jr. (d. 1900).

Following the death of her children, Penfield took up the study of law at Brooklyn Law School (LL.B., 1916), and entered public life. Penfield was admitted to practice law in 1916.

Being an advocate of coeducation, Penfield started a college social-service movement among the coeducational colleges of the United States in 1904. This work was later carried on by the Inter-Sorority Conference. Penfield was National President of the Kappa Kappa Gamma from 1900 to 1902.

"God is with the suffragists." (E. Jean Nelson Penfield, July 12, 1911)

In 1909, when the Woman Suffrage Party was organized, with Carrie Chapman Catt as chair, Penfield, previously untried in any large work, became vice-chair. She soon displayed such ability that when Catt found it impossible to continue serving in the chief place, the position was thrust upon Penfield; she served as president during the period of 1910–12. She thus became one of the most conspicuous figures in suffrage work. Penfield also served as chair of the national committee to establish the representative district form of organization for suffrage work throughout the country.

She resumed her work in New York City, and became actively engaged in many sociological movements as well as church and club work. She worked as a lecturer and college examiner of manuscripts, as well as a teacher of parliamentary law, and also a singer.

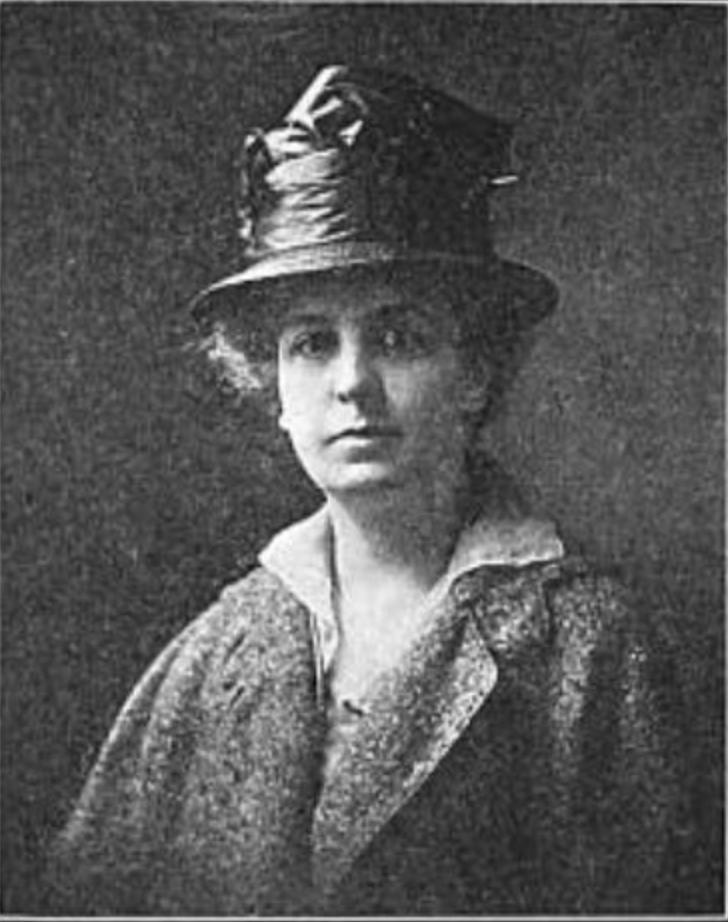
Penfield in 1917

During World War I, Penfield was in charge of the department of practical law for women at Brooklyn Law School of St. Lawrence University.

She was the Honorary President of the Woman's Practical Law Association; honorary national vice-president of Phi Delta Delta; and a member of the Board of Directors of the International Marriage and Divorce Committee. Penfield was a prominent member of many women's organizations, including the Sorosis, College Equal Suffrage League, Daughters of the American Revolution, Daughters of 1812, Westchester Woman's Club, National Woman Lawyers Association (counsel for State of New York), American Bar Association, New York County Lawyers' Association, Bronx Woman's Club, Kappa Kappa Gamma Sorority, Daughters of Indiana in New York, United Daughters of the Confederacy, and National League of American Pen Women.

== Personal life ==
Penfield's New York City home was on 242nd Street in 1914, on 195th Street in 1917, on Columbus Circle in 1924, and on 195th Street in 1928. Her office was located at 280 Broadway. She also spent time in the colonial homestead (built 1790) at the northern boundary of New York city, which had been passed down to her husband through many generations. On its extensive grounds, Penfield does gardening, canning, preserving and jelly-making.

In politics, she joined the Republican Party. In religion, she was Methodist. Penfield was author of Mother Mine and other published poems.

E. Jean Nelson Penfield died in Indianapolis, Indiana, on February 27, 1961.

== Selected works ==
=== Books ===
- Mother Mine
- Outline study of parliamentary law; a course of twelve lessons with introduction, instruction for class work, and question lists. (Prepared for use of teachers and groups where instructor is not desired) (Mount Vernon, N. Y., T. M. Taylor & Co., 1914)

=== Articles ===
- The Twentieth Amendment, Ladies Home Journal, January 1921

=== Other ===
- "Penfield's Parliamentary Law Chart"
