= Irene Stolofsky =

American violinist (1896–1950)

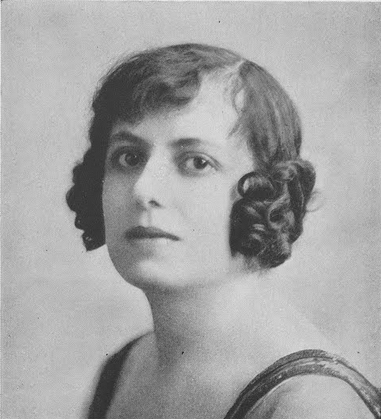
- Irene Stolofsky, from a 1922 publication
- Born: 1896; Chicago, U.S.
- Died: July 28, 1950 (aged 54); Chicago, U.S.
- Other names: Irene Stolofsky Davis (after 1926)
- Occupation: Violinist

Irene Stolofsky (1896 – July 28, 1950), sometimes billed as Irene Stolofsky Davis after 1926, was a violinist from Chicago. She made several recordings in the 1910s, and toured the United States and Canada on the Chautauqua circuit in the 1920s.

== Early life ==
Stolofsky was born in Chicago, the daughter of Meyer Stolofsky and Anna Barkman Stolofsky. She trained as a violinist with Hugh (Harry) Dimond at the Metropolitan Conservatory of Music in Chicago.

== Career ==
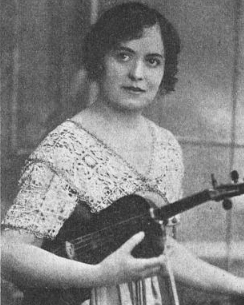
Irene Stolofsky with her violin, from a 1919 publication

Stolofsky made several recordings between 1915 and 1917. In the 1919–1920 season, she toured with Bohumir Kryl's Orchestral Sextette, as the group's leader. She was active on the Chautauqua circuit in the 1920s, billed as the Irene Stolofsky Company, working with various vocalists and pianists, including Grace Johnson Konold, George Imbrie, Magdalene Massman, and Herbert Macfarren. "Miss Stolofsky is quite a dazzling virtuoso," wrote one California critic in 1923, "She is very certain in her technique, and never flinches at such an exhibition of fireworks as is contained in Hubay's Scenes de la Szarda. At the same time she has a singing tone of great power and depth."

She continued playing for audiences, though not on national tours, after her marriage in 1926. She was still performing and teaching violin in the Chicago area in 1944, when she appeared in a musical program by the Illinois Federation of Music Clubs.

== Personal life ==
Irene Stolofsky married Meyer Davis in October 1926. She died in 1950, aged 54 years, in Chicago.
