= Van den Hende =

van den Hende or Vandenhende is a surname. Notable people with the surname include:

- Flavie Van den Hende (1865–1925), Belgian cellist
- Hans van den Hende (born 1964), Dutch Roman Catholic bishop
- Séverine Vandenhende (born 1974), French judoka
