= Villa-Maria station (Montreal Metro) =

Montreal Metro station

Villa-Maria
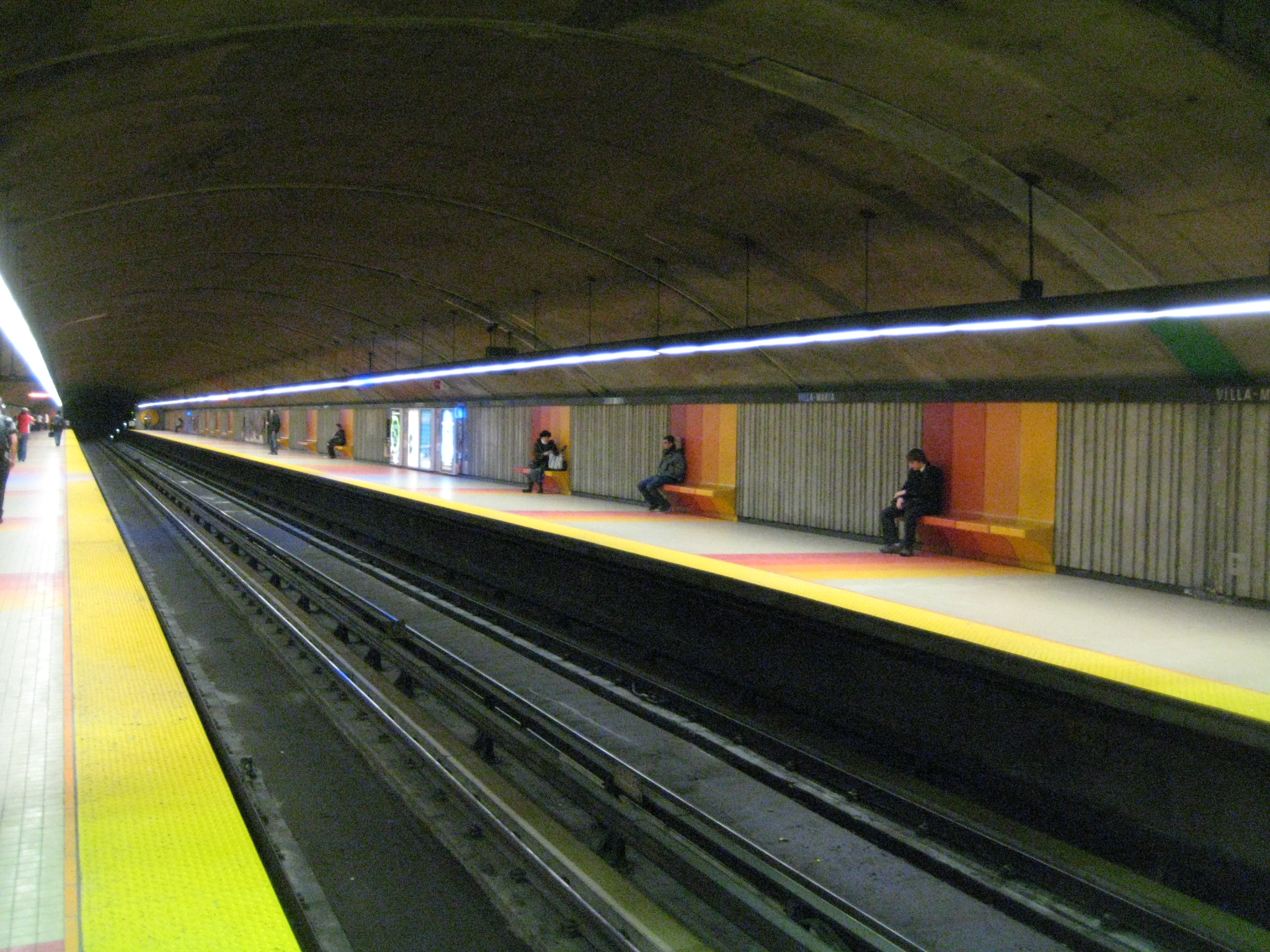

General information
- Location: 4331, boul. Décarie; Montreal, Quebec H4A 3K4; Canada
- Coordinates: 45°28′46″N 73°37′11″W
- Operator: Société de transport de Montréal
- Platforms: 2 side platforms
- Tracks: 2
- Connections: STM bus

Construction
- Depth: 19.8 metres (65 feet), 14th deepest
- Accessible: Yes
- Architect: André Léonard

Other information
- Fare zone: ARTM: A

History
- Opened: 7 September 1981

Passengers
- 2024: 2,902,282 ▲8.42%
- Rank: 33 of 68

Services
Preceding station	Montreal Metro	Following station
Snowdon toward Côte-Vertu	Orange Line	Vendôme toward Montmorency
Location

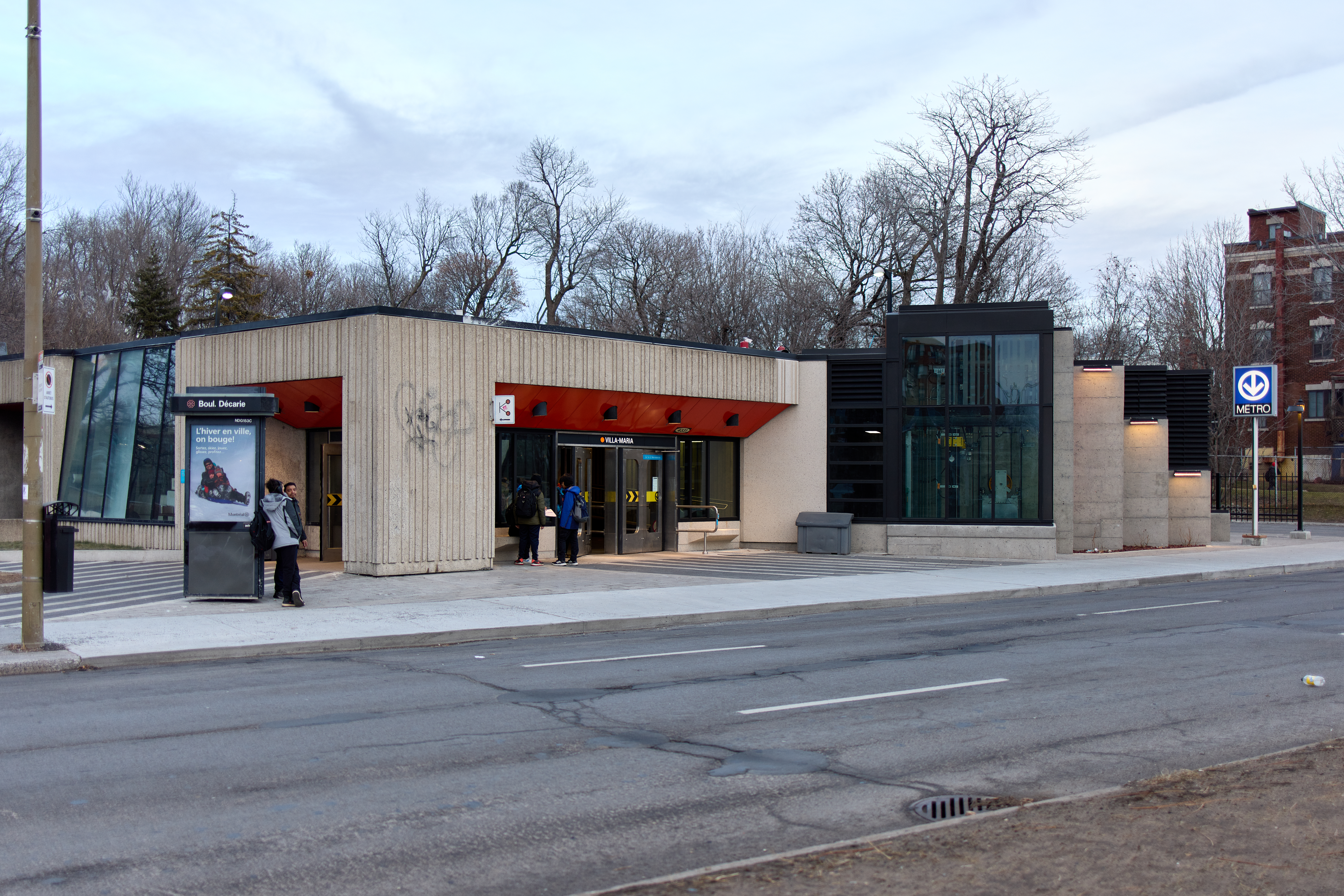
Station exterior

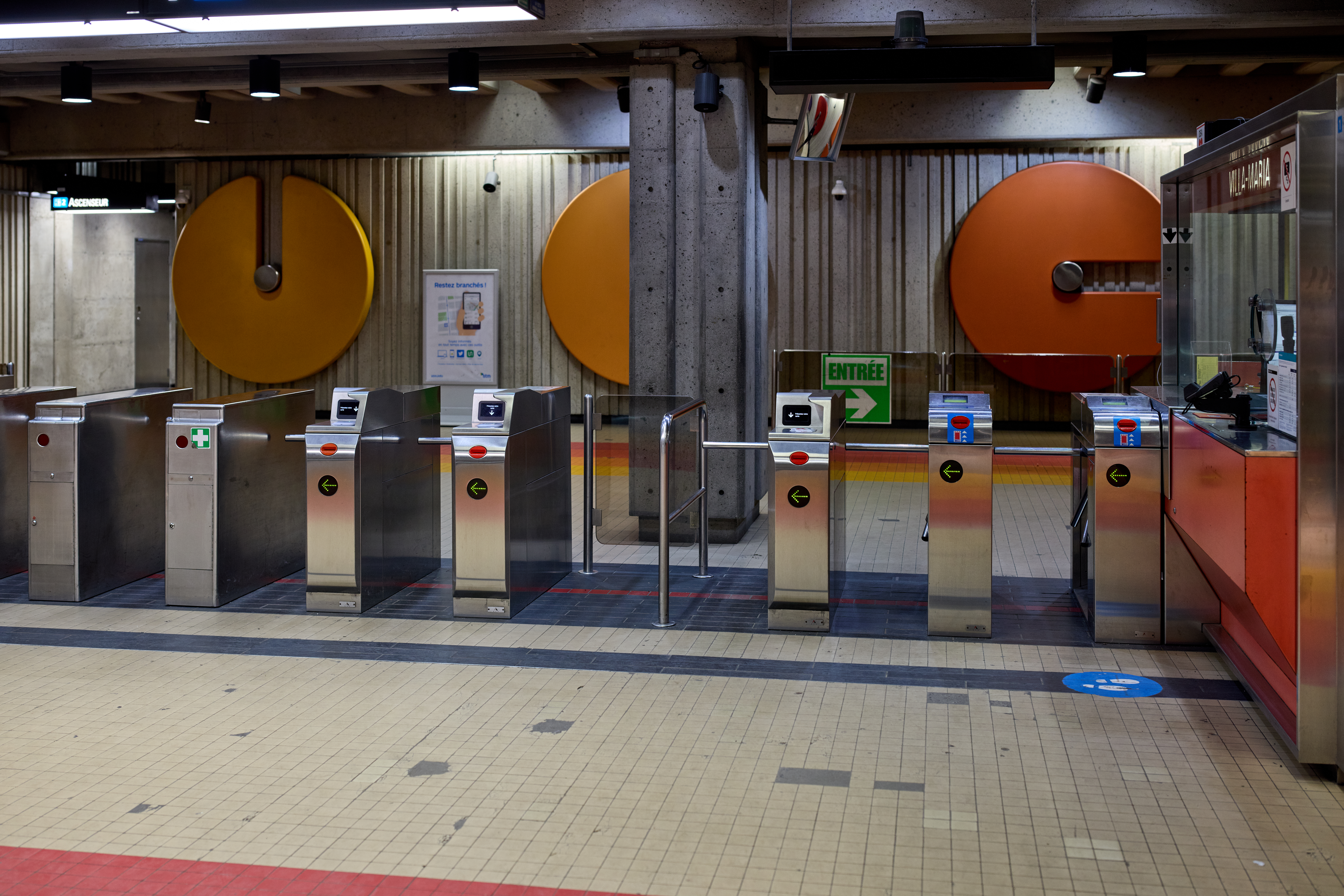
Turnstiles at Villa-Maria

Villa-Maria station is a Montreal Metro station in the borough of Côte-des-Neiges–Notre-Dame-de-Grâce in Montreal, Quebec, Canada. It is operated by the Société de transport de Montréal (STM) and serves the Orange Line. It is located in the Westmount Adjacent area of the Notre-Dame-de-Grâce neighbourhood, beside the Décarie Expressway trench.

== Overview ==
The station is a normal side platform station and has an entrance at its south end. The entrance is located in a bus loop located on the Décarie Autoroute.

== Station improvements ==
In 2019, work began to make the station fully accessible at a cost of $24.6m. The work included the installation of three elevators, station renovation works and the installation of new artwork. The project was completed in November 2022, making Villa-Maria the 23rd accessible station in the Metro.

== Architecture and artwork ==
The station was designed by André Léonard. The architect also designed mural sculptures for the station of large moulded dials in a variety of colours. Floor and wall tiling also make use of colours throughout the station.

As part of work to make the station accessible, La correspondance des strates, by the artist Marianne Chevalier, was unveiled in September 2022. Using colorful geometric & organic shapes cut of aluminium, the work quotes the shapes and colours of the 1980s sculptures designed by station architect André Léonard.

== Origin of name ==
Villa-Maria station takes its name from the nearby Villa Maria school, which in turn takes its name from the Latin for "House of Mary" and also suggesting the original name of the colony that became Montreal, Ville-Marie.

The surrounding lands were once owned by the Decarie family. The land was sold in 1795 to Sir James Monk. The Monk residence was built in 1804 in the central section of the present-day school. In 1844, the building was leased to the Crown as a residence for the Governor General of Canada. (Lord Metcalfe, Earl Cathcart, and Lord Elgin resided on the Monklands.

The property became a country hotel for five years. In 1854, it was purchased by the nuns of Congregation of Notre Dame, who turned it into a private girls' school, which they named Villa Maria. The metro station was built at the foot of the Villa Maria property.

== Connecting bus routes ==
Société de transport de Montréal
No.	Route	Connects to	Service times / notes
24	Sherbrooke	Sherbrooke	Daily
103	Monkland		Daily
162	Westminster	Montréal-Ouest	Daily

== Nearby points of interest ==
- Marianopolis College
- Villa Maria secondary school
- Marymount Academy
- The Monkland Village
- MAB-Mackay Rehabilitation Centre
- Centennial Academy
