= Interprovincial migration in Canada =

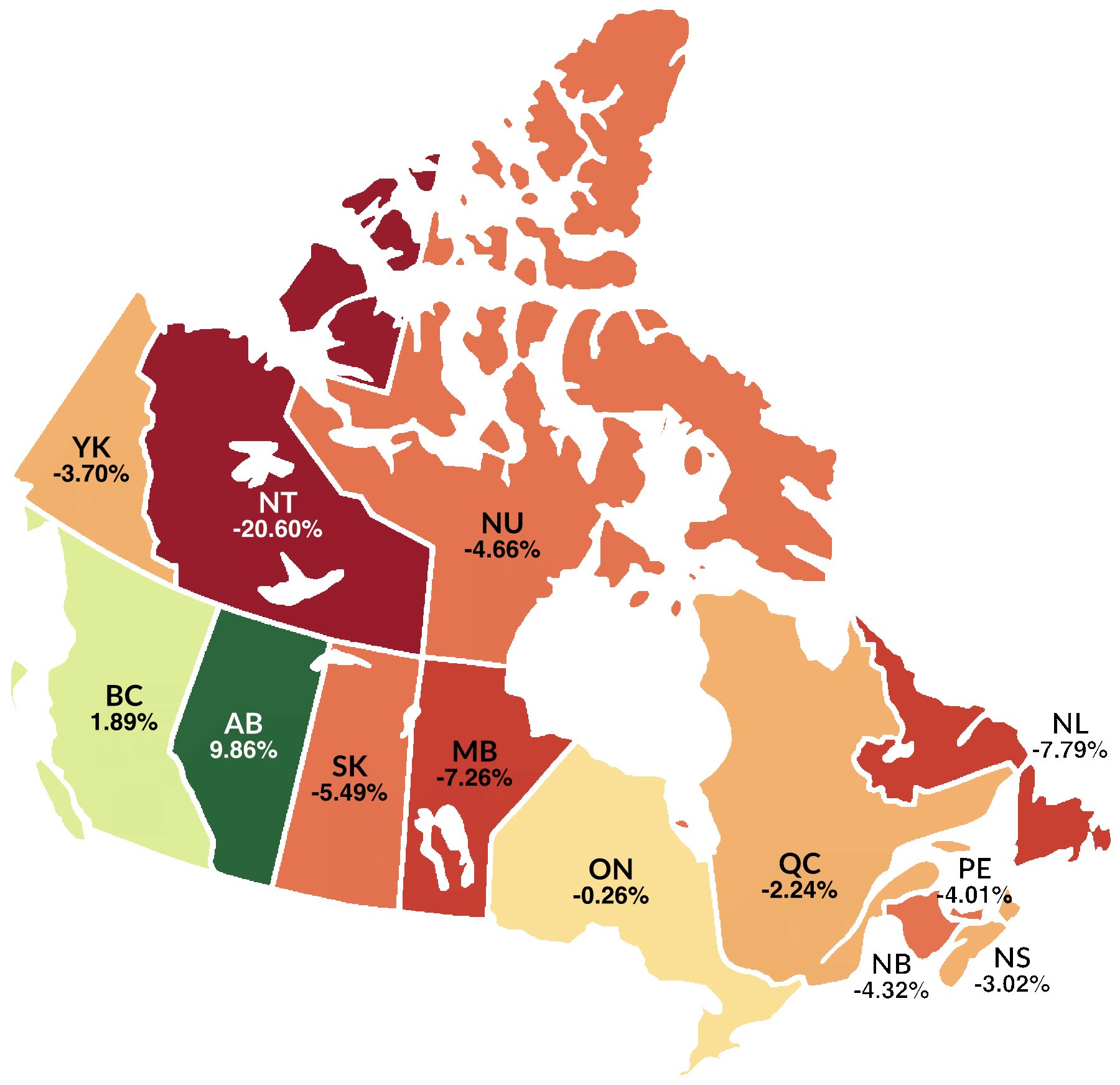
Net cumulative interprovincial migration for each province and territory (1997–2017), as a share of population (Reds indicate loss, greens gain.)

Interprovincial migration in Canada is the movement by people from one Canadian province or territory to another with the intention of settling, permanently or temporarily, in the new province or territory; it is more-or-less stable over time. In fiscal year 2019–20, 278,316 Canadians migrated province, representing 0.729% of the population.

The Interprovincial migration levels of each province can be construed as a way to measure the success of each jurisdiction. The main measurement used is net interprovincial migration, which is simply the difference between residents moving out of a province (out-migration) and the number of residents from other provinces moving into that province (in-migration). Since 1971, the provinces which received the most net cumulative interprovincial migrants (adjusted for population) were Alberta and British Columbia, while the provinces which had the largest net loss of interprovincial migrants (adjusted for population) were Saskatchewan, Manitoba, Quebec, and the Atlantic provinces.

== History ==
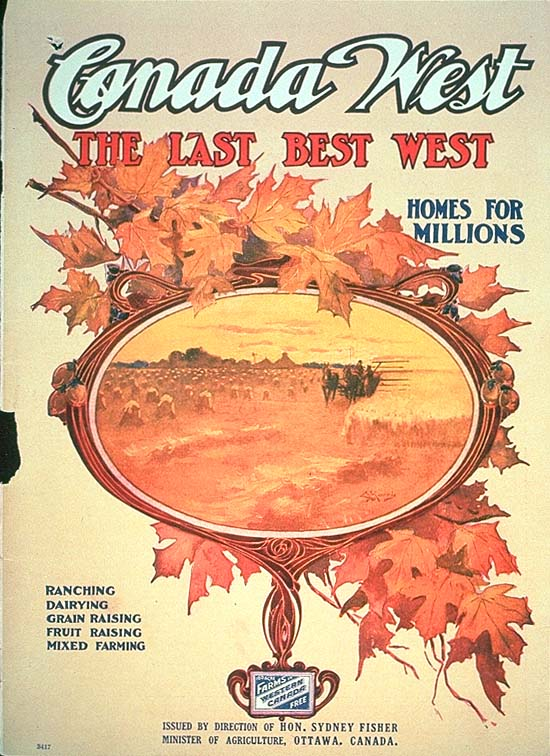
Pamphlet advertising for immigration to Western Canada, c. 1910

In the 19th and early 20th centuries, Canadians who left their home province to settle elsewhere usually went to the United States rather than to other Canadian provinces. In fact, from the early years of confederation to the 1930s, Quebec and the Maritimes experienced a period of mass emigration to the United States. From 1860 to 1920, half a million people left the Maritimes, while about 900,000 French Canadians left Quebec between 1840 and 1930 to immigrate to the United States, mainly New England.

However, some French Canadians and Maritimers were also drawn to Ontario in the 19th and early 20th centuries, when the development of mining and forestry resources in the northeastern and eastern regions of the province attracted a large workforce. This migration significantly increased the proportion of Francophones in Ontario. The Francophone population of Ontario continues to be concentrated mainly in the northeastern and eastern parts, close to the border with Quebec, although smaller pockets of Francophone settlement exist throughout the province.

After Manitoba joined Confederation in 1870, the new provincial government was controlled by Anglo Canadians. The agreement for the establishment of the province had included guarantees that the Métis would receive grants of land and that their existing unofficial landholdings would be recognized. These guarantees were largely ignored. New anglophone migrants coming from Ontario were instead given most of the land. Facing this discrimination, the Métis moved in large numbers to what would become Saskatchewan and Alberta.

Starting in 1871, the Canadian government entered multiple treaties with indigenous nations to gain their consent to take their lands "for immigration and settlement" in the area of the former Rupert's Land (although many of the treaty terms made to get this consent were subsequently violated by Canada). The Dominion government then passed the Dominion Lands Act in 1872 to encourage the settlement of the Canadian Prairies, and to help prevent the area from being claimed by the United States. The act gave a claimant 160 acres (or 65 hectares) for free, the only cost to the farmer being a $10 administration fee. Any male farmer who was at least 21 years of age and agreed to cultivate at least 40 acres (16 ha) of the land and build a permanent dwelling on it (within three years) qualified. The population of the Canadian prairies grew rapidly in the last decade of the 19th century, and the population of Saskatchewan quintupled from 91,000 in 1901 to 492,000 to 1911. However, the vast majority of these people were immigrants from Europe. Interprovincial migration in Canada was at its highest in the first 20 years of the 20th century, and started to decrease in the 1920s.

Out-emigration from Quebec dramatically spiked in 1977, one year after the Parti Québécois won the 1976 Quebec general elections. It spiked again in 1996, one year after the 1995 Quebec referendum. This second spike was, however, 37.5% the size of the 1977 spike.

Migration from Atlantic Canada to Ontario and the West in search of economic opportunity is longstanding phenomenon. It is depicted in works including Goin' Down the Road (1970), a key piece in Canadian film history. The cod collapse in the early 1990s and the 1992 moratorium on cod fishing led to the migration of workers from Atlantic Canada (particularly Newfoundland and Labrador) to Alberta. Fishing had previously been a major driver of the economies of the Atlantic provinces, and this loss of work proved catastrophic for many families. As a result, beginning in the early 1990s and into the late 2000s, thousands of people from the Atlantic provinces were driven out-of-province to find work elsewhere in the country, especially in the Alberta oil sands during the oil boom of the mid-2000s. This systemic export of labour is explored by author Kate Beaton in her 2022 graphic memoir Ducks, which details her experience working in the Athabasca oil sands.

== Influences ==
A number of factors have been identified by academic research in influencing interprovincial migration.

=== Demographic factors ===
The odds of a Canadian moving from one province to another is inversely related to the home province's population size: the larger the province, the less likely a resident is to move away. Interprovincial migration is negatively related to marriage, and the presence of children for both men and women. Younger people also tend to be more mobile than their older counterparts. Men are more likely to move than women, although men's rates of interprovincial migration are declining slightly while women's are holding steadier or rising slightly.

Interprovincial migration is also more common among residents of smaller cities, towns, and especially rural areas than for residents of larger cities. The largest Canadian population centres (Toronto, Vancouver, Montréal, Calgary and Edmonton) also tend to attract the largest amount of interprovincial migrants, and there is a lot of flow between these cities.

=== Economic factors ===
The economic situation of each province is an important indicator of internal migration within Canada. It is more likely for people to move out of a province with higher unemployment rate. Interprovincial migration is also positively related to the individuals' receipt of unemployment insurance, having no market income, and the receipt of social assistance (especially for men). Canadian provinces also tend to lose more people than they gain when their province is in recession. Alberta, for example, experienced a net loss of people to interprovincial migration from September 2015 to December 2017.

=== Language ===
Language spoken is a strong predictor of interprovincial migration. Francophone Quebeckers are among the groups of people who are the least likely to move across provinces. Francophones in New Brunswick are much less likely to move out of province than their Anglophone counterparts.

The only group less likely to migrate across provinces than Francophone Quebeckers is Francophone immigrants living in Quebec. Inversely, Francophone immigrants living outside Quebec is the group most prone to interprovincial migration, as 9.2% of them move to another province. Over half of Francophones outside Quebec (immigrant and Canada-born) who migrate across provinces choose Quebec as their destination.

=== Literacy ===
Literacy used to be a significant indicator of interprovincial migration in Canada in the late 19th and early 20th century. Anglophone Canadians who could read were more likely to move than their illiterate counterparts. For Francophone Quebeckers, however, this was the opposite, as literate unilingual Francophones were more likely to stay in Quebec than illiterate unilingual Francophones. Literacy had, however, no effect on the likelihood of migration of bilingual Quebeckers.

== Provincial level ==
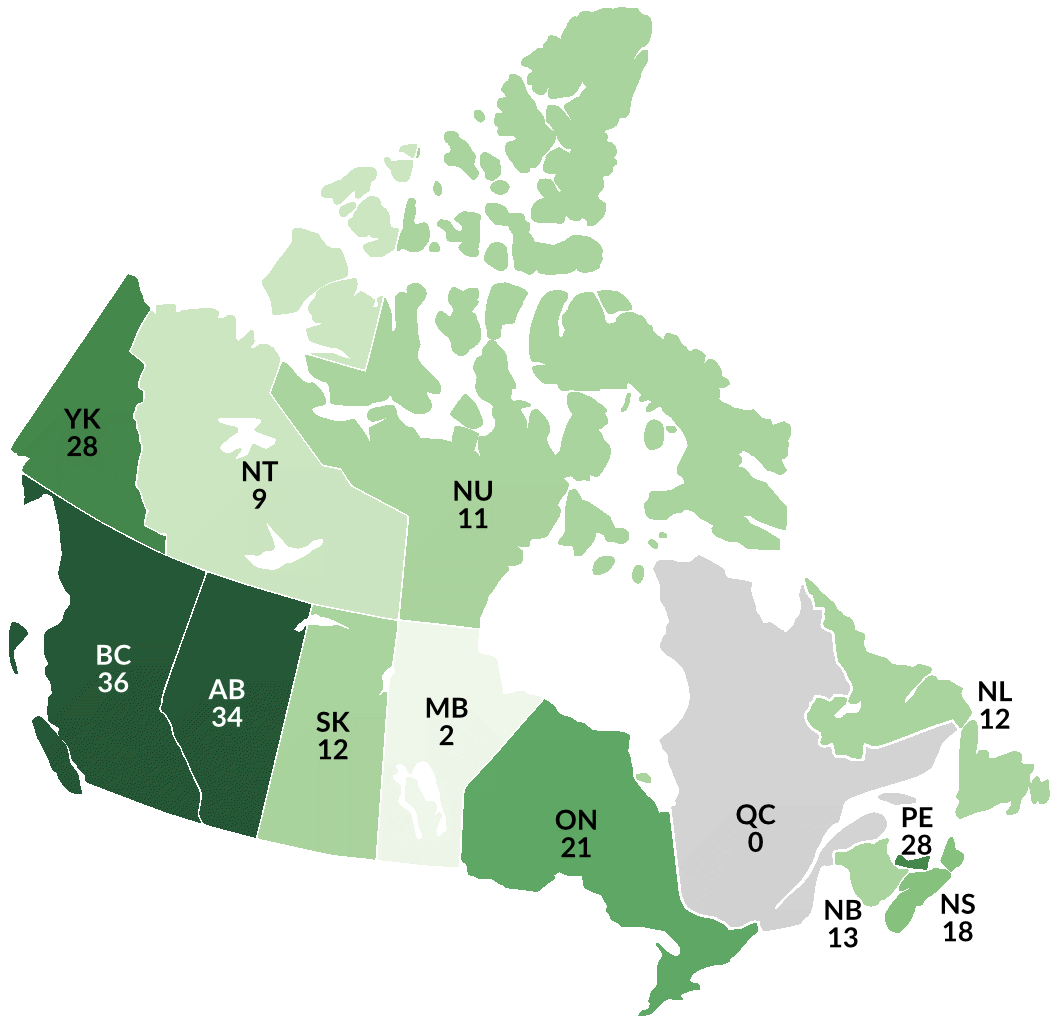
Number of years between 1971 and 2019 that each province and territory had positive interprovincial immigration. Darker shades represent more years.

=== Alberta ===
Over the past five decades, Alberta has had the highest net increase from interprovincial migration of any province. However, it typically experiences population decline during economic downturns, as it did during the 1980s. Oil is the main industry driving interprovincial migration to Alberta, as many Canadians move to Alberta to work in the oil fields or spin-off sectors. Interprovincial migration to Alberta rises and drops dependent of the price of oil. There was a dramatic reduction after the 2014 drop in oil prices, however, it dramatically recovered starting in 2021-22 and reached historic highs thereafter.

Interprovincial migration in Alberta
	In-migrants	Out-migrants	Net migration
2011–12	▲80,837	▼53,185	▲27,652
2012–13	▲84,602	▼46,004	▲38,598
2013–14	▲87,307	▲51,925	▼35,382
2014–15	▼81,540	▲59,946	▼21,594
2015–16	▼56,978	▲72,086	▼ −15,108
2016–17	▼50,396	▼65,955	▼ −15,559
2017–18	▲55,147	▼58,394	▲ −3,247
2018–19	▼52,796	▼54,828	▲ −2,032
2019–20	▲56,538	▲58,915	▼ −2,377
2020–21	▼44,777	▼54,235	▼ −9,458
2021–22	▲73,701	▲68,055	▲5,646
2022–23	▲92,604	▼53,196	▲39,408
2023–24	▲95,282	▼46,888	▲48,394
2024–25	▼74,135	▲47,759	▼26,376
2025–26	▼71,496	▲49,834	▼21,662

Source: Statistics Canada

=== British Columbia ===
British Columbia has also traditionally been gaining from interprovincial migration. Over the last 50 years, British Columbia had 13 years of negative interprovincial immigration: the lowest in the country. The only time the province significantly lost population to this phenomenon was during the 1990s, when it had a negative interprovincial migration for 5 consecutive years.

Interprovincial migration in British Columbia
	In-migrants	Out-migrants	Net migration
2011–12	▲48,593	▲51,304	▼ −2,711
2012–13	▼43,830	▼45,698	▲ −1,868
2013–14	▲52,281	▼42,806	▲9,475
2014–15	▲61,026	▼40,647	▲20,379
2015–16	▲63,788	▼37,215	▲26,573
2016–17	▼57,210	▲38,376	▼18,834
2017–18	▼55,300	▲41,311	▼13,989
2018–19	▼53,434	▼40,109	▼13,325
2019–20	▲60,584	▲43,585	▲16,999
2020–21	▼59,313	▼33,937	▲25,376
2021–22	▲77,626	▲51,557	▲26,069
2022–23	▼63,087	▲59,699	▼3,388
2023–24	▼55,165	▼59,292	▼ −4,127
2024–25	▼53,518	▼50,939	▲2,579
2025–26	▼53,265	▼46,337	▲6,928

Source: Statistics Canada

=== Manitoba ===
Manitoba is one of the provinces most affected by interprovincial migration, having had a negative mobility ratio for 42 out of 46 years from 1971 to 2017. This is the second-worst record for years of negative interprovincial migration, followed only by Quebec.

Interprovincial migration in Manitoba
	In-migrants	Out-migrants	Net migration
2011–12	▲11,443	▲15,655	▼ −4,212
2012–13	▼9,988	▼14,994	▼ −5,006
2013–14	▼9,452	▲16,303	▼ −6,851
2014–15	▲10,022	▲16,700	▲ −6,678
2015–16	▲10,994	▼15,875	▲ −4,881
2016–17	▼10,350	▼15,474	▼ −5,124
2017–18	▼9,578	▲16,726	▼ −7,148
2018–19	▼9,427	▲16,778	▼ −7,351
2019–20	▲10,376	▲18,673	▼ −8,297
2020–21	▼12,796	▼15,600	▲ −2,804
2021–22	▲15,206	▲22,657	▼ −7,451
2022–23	▼13,629	▲23,557	▼ −9,928
2023–24	▼12,244	▼20,643	▲ −8,399
2024–25	▼12,178	▼15,353	▲ −3,175
2025–26	▲12,900	▲18,191	▼ −5,291

Source: Statistics Canada

=== New Brunswick ===
New Brunswick has typically experienced less emigration than its size and economic situation would suggest, probably because of the low rate of emigration of its Francophone population. New Brunswick was predicted to continue low or negative population growth in the long term due to interprovincial migration and a low birth rate. However, the rate turned positive starting in 2017, and accelerated upwards afterward.

Interprovincial migration in New Brunswick
	In-migrants	Out-migrants	Net migration
2011–12	▼10,044	▲11,850	▼ −1,806
2012–13	▼8,517	▼11,807	▼ −3,290
2013–14	▲9,055	▲12,572	▼ −3,517
2014–15	▲9,184	▼11,974	▲ −2,790
2015–16	▲10,248	▼11,361	▲ −1,113
2016–17	▼10,136	▼9,702	▲434
2017–18	▲10,709	▲10,228	▲481
2018–19	▲10,821	▲9,152	▲1,669
2019–20	▲11,881	▲10,055	▲1,826
2020–21	▲12,104	▼7,514	▲4,526
2021–22	▲18,276	▲10,359	▲7,897
2022–23	▲18,746	▲11,850	▼6,914
2023–24	▼14,665	▲11,862	▼2,803

Source: Statistics Canada

=== Newfoundland and Labrador ===
Since it started being recorded in 1971, Newfoundland and Labrador is the province that has lost the biggest share of its population to interprovincial migration, which was especially high in the 1990s. Out-migration from the province was curtailed in 2008 and net migration stayed positive through 2014, when it again dropped due to bleak finances and rising unemployment (caused by falling oil prices). With the announcement of the 2016 provincial budget, St. John's Telegram columnist Russell Wangersky published the column "Get out if you can", which urged young Newfoundlanders to leave the province to avoid future hardships. In the 2021 Canadian census, Newfoundland and Labrador was the only province which recorded a population decline in the previous five years.

Interprovincial migration in Newfoundland and Labrador
	In-migrants	Out-migrants	Net migration
2011–12	▲8,173	▼7,628	▲545
2012–13	▼7,283	▼6,788	▼495
2013–14	▼6,994	▼6,760	▼234
2014–15	▲7,012	▲6,851	▼161
2015–16	▼6,600	▼6,368	▲232
2016–17	▼5,400	▲6,830	▼ −1,430
2017–18	▼5,187	▲7,920	▼ −2,733
2018–19	▼4,914	▼7,511	▲ −2,597
2019–20	▲5,525	▲7,541	▲ −2,016
2020–21	▼5,414	▼4,877	▲577
2021–22	▲7,960	▲6,158	▲1,802
2022–23	▼7,795	▲7,253	▼542
2023–24	▼7,031	▼6,433	▲598

Source: Statistics Canada

=== Nova Scotia ===
From 1971 to 2012, Nova Scotia had a persistent negative trend in net interprovincial migration. Combined with a declining birth rate, this poses a significant demographic challenge for the province, as its population is projected to decline from 948,000 people in 2011 to 926,000 people in 2038. The destination for Nova Scotia migrants was most often Ontario, until the turn of the 21st century when Alberta became a more popular destination; New Brunswick ranks as a distant third. In a dramatic shift, by the late 2010s and especially afterward, Nova Scotia became one of the preferred destinations in Canada with significant in-migration, mainly from Ontario.

Interprovincial migration in Nova Scotia
	In-migrants	Out-migrants	Net migration
2011–12	▼14,410	▲17,276	▼ −2,866
2012–13	▼12,630	▼16,147	▼ −3,517
2013–14	▲13,402	▼15,973	▲ −2,571
2014–15	▲13,854	▲16,165	▲ −2,311
2015–16	▲15,107	▼14,353	▲754
2016–17	▲15,339	▼12,500	▲2,839
2017–18	▲15,509	▼12,461	▲3,048
2018–19	▲15,757	▼12,125	▲3,632
2019–20	▲18,912	▲13,345	▲5,567
2020–21	▲19,046	▼10,146	▲8,900
2021–22	▲25,507	▲13,806	▲11,701
2022–23	▼24,226	▲15,700	▼8,526
2023–24	▼17,748	▼15,496	▼2,252

Source: Statistics Canada

=== Ontario ===
Ontario's interprovincial migrations have shifted over the years. It was negative in the 1970s, positive in the 1980s, but then negative again in the 1990s. It returned to positive figures around the time of the turn of the millennium, was consistently in the negatives from 2003 to 2015, then returned to the positives through 2018 before returning to negative - a trend that accelerated in the 2020s largely due to high housing prices. Over the period from 1971 to 2015, Ontario was the province that experienced the second-lowest levels of interprovincial in-migration and out-migration, second only to Quebec. Out-migration from Northern Ontario especially of young and working-age adults, either intraprovincially to Southern Ontario or to other provinces especially in the West, has been a public issue since the 1990s.

Interprovincial migration in Ontario
	In-migrants	Out-migrants	Net migration
2011–12	▲60,459	▲71,070	▼ −10,611
2012–13	▼54,678	▼68,579	▼ −13,901
2013–14	▲57,415	▲71,979	▼ −14,564
2014–15	▲62,874	▼71,569	▲ −8,695
2015–16	▲71,790	▼62,713	▲9,077
2016–17	▼71,717	▼58,335	▲13,382
2017–18	▼69,918	▲59,974	▼9,944
2018–19	▼66,980	▲60,351	▲6,629
2019–20	▲75,188	▲72,394	▼2,794
2020–21	▼56,443	▲74,848	▼ −18,405
2021–22	▲77,390	▲108,408	▼ −31,018
2022–23	▼70,731	▲112,660	▼ −41,929
2023–24	▼66,858	▼92,131	▲ −25,273

Source: Statistics Canada

=== Prince Edward Island ===
Since 1971, Prince Edward Island mostly had years of positive interprovincial migration. However, in the 2010s, it turned to the negative for a few years before returning to positive again. This interprovincial migration exceeded all immigration to the province in 2015.

Interprovincial migration in Prince Edward Island
	In-migrants	Out-migrants	Net migration
2011–12	▲2,620	▲3,238	▼ −618
2012–13	▼2,294	▼3,195	▼ −901
2013–14	▼2,198	▼3,139	▼ −941
2014–15	▲2,367	▼3,049	▲ −682
2015–16	▲2,874	▼2,844	▲30
2016–17	▲3,124	▼2,680	▲444
2017–18	▲3,193	▲3,016	▼177
2018–19	▲3,562	▼2,900	▲662
2019–20	▲4,500	▲3,350	▲1,150
2020–21	▼3,846	▼2,626	▲1,220
2021–22	▲5,240	▲3,532	▲1,708
2022–23	▲5,354	▲3,767	▼1,587
2023–24	▼4,057	▲3,975	▼82

Source: Statistics Canada

=== Quebec ===
Since it began being recorded in 1971 until 2018, each year Quebec has had negative interprovincial migration, and among the provinces it has experienced the largest net loss of people due to the effect. Between 1981 and 2017, Quebec lost about 229,700 people below the age of 45 to interprovincial migration. Per capita, Quebec has lost significantly fewer people than other provinces. This is due to the large population of the province and the very low migration rate of Francophone Quebeckers. However, Quebec receives much fewer than average in-migrants from other provinces.

In Quebec, Allophones are more likely to migrate out of the province than average: between 1996 and 2001, over 19,170 migrated to other provinces; 18,810 of whom migrated to Ontario.

Interprovincial Migration Between Quebec and Other Provinces and Territories by Mother Tongue
Mother Tongue / Year	1971–1976	1976–1981	1981–1986	1986–1991	1991–1996	1996–2001	2001–2006	2006–2011	2011-2016	Total
French	−4,100	−18,000	−12,900	5,200	1,200	−8,900	5,000	−2,610	−9,940	−45,050
English	−52,200	−106,300	−41,600	−22,200	−24,500	−29,200	−8,000	−5,930	−11,005	−300,635
Other	−5,700	−17,400	−8,700	−8,600	−14,100	−19,100	−8,700	−12,710	−16,015	−111,025

Interprovincial migration in Quebec
	In-migrants	Out-migrants	Net migration
2011–12	▲20,179	▲27,094	▼ −6,915
2012–13	▼16,879	▲27,310	▼ −10,431
2013–14	▼16,536	▲30,848	▼ −14,312
2014–15	▲16,611	▲32,753	▼ −16,142
2015–16	▲19,259	▼30,377	▲ −11,118
2016–17	▲19,531	▼27,658	▲ −8,127
2017–18	▲20,777	▼26,470	▲ −5,693
2018–19	▲21,465	▼25,593	▲ −4,128
2019–20	▲25,195	▲29,631	▼ −4,436
2020–21	▼22,096	▼25,040	▲ −2,944
2021–22	▲28,987	▲35,516	▼ −6,529
2022–23	▼24,767	▼30,819	▲ −6,052
2023–24	▼23,969	▼28,074	▲ −4,105

Source: Statistics Canada

=== Saskatchewan ===
Inter-provincial migration has long been a demographic challenge for Saskatchewan, and it was often said that "Saskatchewan's most valuable export [was] its young people". The trend reversed in 2006 as the nascent oil fracking industry started growing in the province, but returned to negative net migration starting in 2013. Most people migrating from Saskatchewan move west to Alberta or British Columbia.

Interprovincial migration in Saskatchewan
	In-migrants	Out-migrants	Net migration
2011–12	▲19,386	▲17,508	▲1,878
2012–13	▼16,982	▼16,590	▼392
2013–14	▼16,371	▲18,210	▼ −1,839
2014–15	▼15,346	▲19,874	▼ −4,528
2015–16	▼15,260	▼19,532	▲ −4,272
2016–17	▼13,130	▼18,890	▼ −5,760
2017–18	▼11,637	▲20,112	▼ −8,475
2018–19	▼11,100	▲20,541	▼ −9,441
2019–20	▲11,665	▲23,077	▼ −11,412
2020–21	▼10,939	▼18,113	▲ −7,174
2021–22	▲14,623	▲24,116	▼ −9,493
2022–23	▲15,510	▼21,898	▲ −6,388
2023–24	▼14,772	▼20,011	▲ −5,239

Source: Statistics Canada

== See also ==
- Territorial evolution of Canada
