= Flavie Van den Hende =

Belgian cello player

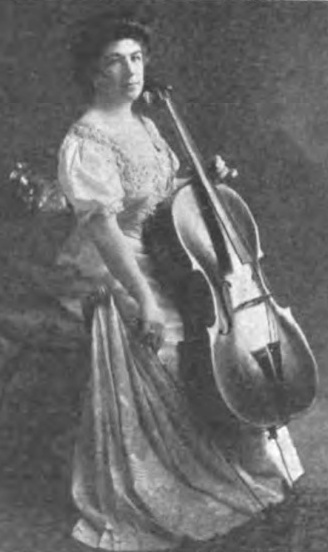
- Flavie Van den Hende, from a 1908 publication.
- Born: February 25, 1865; Renaix (Ronse), Belgium
- Died: July 9, 1925 (aged 60); Yonkers
- Occupation: Cellist

Flavie Van den Hende (February 25, 1865 – July 9, 1925) was a Belgian cellist.

== Early life ==
Van den Hende was born in Renaix, Belgium, and studied music in Brussels at the Royal Conservatory, under Joseph Servais.

== Career ==
Van den Hende played professionally in several European cities before she moved to the United States in 1890, and to New York in 1892. By 1896, an American magazine declared that "Madam Flavie Van den Hende has had a singularly successful season. Her charming personality has made her a welcome guest at most of the fashionable musicales of the season."

Van den Hende was a guest soloist with the New York Symphony Orchestra, the Cincinnati Symphony Orchestra, the Chicago Symphony Orchestra, and the Metropolitan Opera. She was a member of the New York Ladies' Trio with violinist Dora Valesca Becker and various pianists between 1895 and 1900, violinist Ida Branth and pianist Hilda Newman in 1900, and with Rossi Gisch and Hilda Newman after 1900. In 1901 she joined a quartet.

Van den Hende toured in the central and southern United States in 1900. She toured in the South again in 1908. In 1922, she was a member of the Verdi Club Trio with Rosalie Heller Klein and Mozelle Bennett.

== Personal life ==
Van den Hende died in 1925, aged 60 years, at her home in Yonkers.
