= American Institute of Applied Music =

Music school in New York City

The American Institute of Applied Music was a music school in New York City. It was incorporated in 1900 through the merger of four institutions: the Metropolitan College of Music, founded in 1891; the Metropolitan Conservatory of Music, founded in 1886; the Synthetic Piano School, founded in 1887; and the American Institute of Normal Methods.

Kate Sara Chittenden, who founded both the Metropolitan College of Music and the Synthetic Piano School, was one of the institute's leading figures. She became dean and head of the piano department at the Metropolitan College in 1892 and continued in those roles at the American Institute until 1933.

The school aimed for systematic thoroughness. The average enrollment was about 350 per year. Grove's Dictionary of Music and Musicians, published in 1920, stated that more than 1,000 teachers had received certificates. The institute was located at 212 West 59th Street.

== Accreditation ==
The National Association of Schools of Music, at its fifth annual meeting in 1928, accepted the institute's application for membership.

== Institutional structure ==
New York's thirty-eighth University Convocation assembled on June 25, 1900, in Albany and, among other things, granted a provisional charter to the American Institute of Applied Music, authorizing the issuing of $15,000 capital stock. The University of the State of New York represents colleges, academies and other institutions subject to the visitation of the Board of Regents.

== Former faculty & administration ==
Governance:

- Edgar Oscar Silver (1860–1909), president
- John B. Calvert, D.D., president

Dean:

- Kate Sara Chittenden (1856–1949) was the founding dean and head of the piano department from 1892 to 1933. During her lifetime, she taught more than 3,000 students.

Faculty:

- Modest Altschuler (1873–1963), Russian-American cellist, conductor, and composer
- Paul Ambrose (1868–1941)
- H. Rawlins Baker
- Walter S. Bogert (1865–1959)
- Dudley Buck (1839–1909), composer, author, and organist
- Mary Fidelia Burt ( –1928), taught voice, sight singing, and ear training
- Adrienne Remenyi von Ende (1873–1945), voice teacher
- Herwegh von Ende (1877–1919), director of the violin department
- Tom Karl (1846–1916), Irish-American tenor who, for a period, headed the vocal department
- George Coleman Gow (1860–1938), song composer and theory professor
- John Cornelius Griggs, PhD (1865–1932)
- Henry G. Hanchett, professor of musical analysis and pedagogy
- John Leslie Hodgson (1880– ), pianist
- Harry Benjamin Jepson (1870–1952), organist
- McCall L. Lanham (1877–1959), baritone voice teacher and director of the voice division
- Daniel Gregory Mason (1873–1953), composer
- William Mason (1829–1908), composer
- E Presson Miller (1864–1950), voice teacher
- Florence Viola Osborn
- Albert Ross Parsons (1847–1933)
- Janet Daniels Schenck (1883–1976), founder of the Manhattan School of Music
- Henry Schradieck (1846–1918), violinist
- Harry Rowe Shelley (1858–1947), organist and composer who taught harmony and counterpoint
- William Fairchild Sherman
- Raymond Huntington Woodman (1861–1943), organist and composer; 1889–98, head of the organ department of Metropolitan College of Music; 1909–41, head of the theory department of the American Institute of Applied Music

== Alumni ==
- Harry H. Sukman (1912–1984), composer and arranger for the TV western series, The High Chaparral
- George King Raudenbush (1899–1956), violinist, orchestra conductor, and composer
- Ida Branth (born 1871), violinist
- Ester Brooke, née Eberstadt
- E. Jean Nelson Penfield (1872–1961), National President, Kappa Kappa Gamma
- Alfred Piccaver (1884–1958), British-American operatic tenor
- Irene Stolofsky (1896–1950), violinist
- Gertrude Hoag Wilson (1888–1968), composer and pianist
- Mabel Madison Watson (1872–1952), composer and music educator
- Celie Ellis Turner, actress and playwright
