= Amelia von Ende =

American journalist

Amelia Kemper von Ende (née Kemper; sometimes Amalie) (June 19, 1856 – August 25, 1932) was a Polish-born American writer, pianist, composer, teacher, and translator.

Born in Warsaw of Polish and French extraction, von Ende emigrated to the United States when she was six, settling with her family in Milwaukee. She moved at 19 to Chicago, becoming a radical journalist in partnership with her husband, Heinrich von Ende, who died in 1879. The following year she opened a boarding school for girls of German-American extraction, the Minerva Institute. In 1893 she moved to New York City, where she would become a journalist writing for American and German audiences, largely on cultural themes; during her career she would contribute to the Musical Courier, Die Musik of Berlin, the New York Post, and The Nation. She soon became known as an intermediary between the German and American cultures. She championed the work of Emily Dickinson and Walt Whitman, whose poetry she introduced to German-language audiences; she was the first writer to translate Dickinson into German. 1914 saw the publication of her article "Women as a Creative Force in Music" in Musical America.

Von Ende had an active career as a pianist and composer while living in New York, and taught music history at the Von Ende School of Music, which had been founded by her son Herwegh. She also lectured on various topics, including "German Women Writers", "Woman in Music", "Poland, Old & New", "Post-war Literature at home and abroad" and "Three Centuries of French Thought", to women's societies throughout the United States. Her compositions, some of which remain in manuscript, include works for solo voice, chorus, piano, and violin. She was also known for her literary work, leaving at her death many monographs, works of literary criticism, and translation. A book on New York was published in Berlin in 1909. She published a variety of translations during her career, of works by writers including Georges Clemenceau, Carl Hauptmann, Egbert W. Fowler, and Jakob Schaffner.

Von Ende died in New York City. Her papers are held by the New York Public Library.
