= Allophone (person) =

Canadian with non-English or French first language

In Canada, an allophone is a resident whose first language is neither French nor English. The term parallels anglophone and francophone, which designate people whose mother tongues are English and French, respectively. Some sources do not consider native speakers of Indigenous languages to be allophones.

== Origin of term ==
The word "allophone" (from Greek ἀλλόφωνος allóphōnos "speaking a foreign tongue") is formed from the Greek roots ἄλλος (állos), meaning "other", and φωνή (phōnḗ), meaning "sound" or "voice".

The term became popularized in the 1960s, during the Quiet Revolution, as French Canadian society in Quebec sought to integrate immigrants, most of whom had traditionally integrated into the English-speaking community. As integrating immigrants was deemed essential to assure the survival of French-speaking Quebec in light of plummeting birth rates, demographers devised this category to monitor the integration of immigrants into French- and English-speaking communities. Because allophones often adopt English, French, or both languages at home or learn one language before another, they can be grouped into English or French communities based on home language or first official language learned.

== Demographics ==
In 2006, 20% of the population of Canada was allophone.

=== Ontario ===
In 2021, 20.7% of the population of Ontario was allophone.

=== Quebec ===
Quebec allophone population by mother tongue 2001
Language	Single	Multiple
Total		
1. Italian	124,695	6,065
2. Arabic	76,285	10,245
3. Spanish	70,100	4,825
4. Greek	41,980	1,755
5. Haitian Creole	34,885	5,710
6. Chinese	33,490	705
7. Portuguese	33,360	1,455
8. Vietnamese	21,635	1,125
9. German	17,690	995
10. Polish	17,160	685
11. Armenian	13,935	405
12. Romanian	12,660	460
13. Russian	12,420	355
14. Tamil	11,095	860
15. Persian	10,495	395

Allophones constitute an increasing share of the Quebec population and are the main source of population increase in the province, reflecting both increased levels of immigration, declining birthrates among established anglophone and francophone populations, and a shift in immigration from English-speaking countries to Asia and the Americas. In 1971, allophones were 6.6% of the population. By 2001, this had increased to 10.0%. Speakers of Arabic, Spanish, and Haitian Creole experienced the greatest growth from 1996 to 2001.

Increasing numbers of allophones speak French at home: about 20.4% of allophones in the province reported that they spoke French most often at home in 2001, compared with 16.6% in 1996, and 15.4% in 1991. Most allophones live in Montreal, Quebec's largest metropolitan area. They tend to migrate out of the province: between 1996 and 2001, over 19,170 migrated to other provinces, 18,810 of those to Ontario.

Most allophone students in Quebec attend francophone schools.

== See also ==
- Official bilingualism in Canada
- Languages of Canada
