= Demographics of Canada =

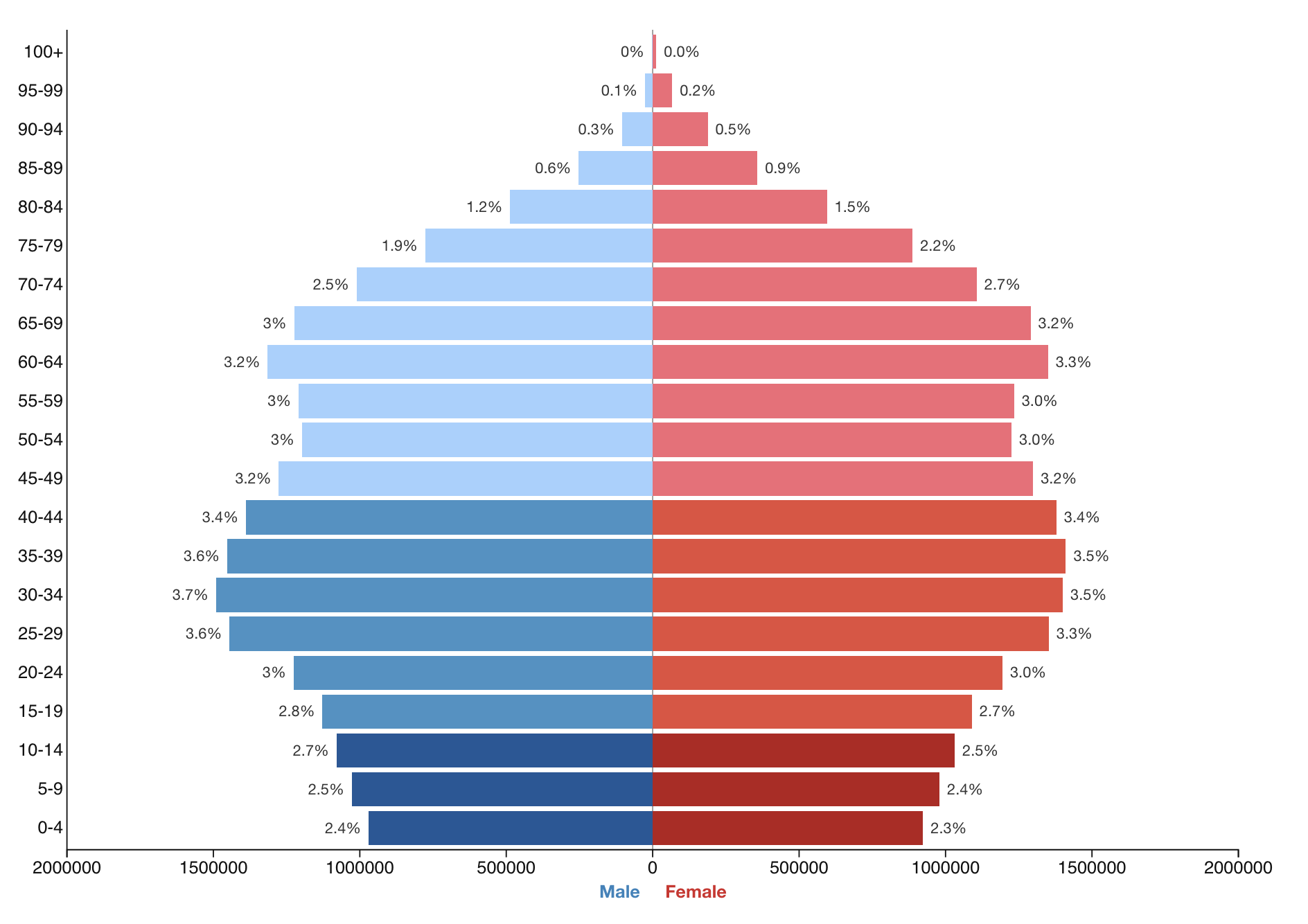
- Population pyramid of Canada in 2026
- Population: ▼41,798,407 (2026 Q2 est.)
- Density: 4.43/km^{2} (11.5/sq mi) (2022)
- Growth rate: ▼ −0.2% (2025 est.)
- Birth rate: ▼9.94 births/1,000 population (2025 est.)
- Death rate: 8.12 deaths/1,000 population (2022 est.)
- Life expectancy: 83.8 years
  - male: 81.52 years
  - female: 86.21 years (2022 est.)
- Fertility rate: 1.26 children born/woman (2025 est.)
- Infant mortality: 4.38 deaths/1,000 live births
- Net migration rate: 5.46 migrant(s)/1,000 population (2022 est.)
- Immigrant share: 22.2% (2024)

Age structure
- 0–14 years: ▼15.0% (2025 est.)
- 15–64 years: ▼64.8% (2025 est.)
- 65 and over: ▲20.3% (2025 est.)

Sex ratio
- Total: 0.98 male(s)/female (2022 est.)
- At birth: 1.05 male(s)/female
- Under 15: 1.06 male(s)/female
- 65 and over: 0.75 male(s)/female

Nationality
- Nationality: Canadian
- Major ethnic: White (69.8%)
- Minor ethnic: South Asian (7.1%); Indigenous (5%); Chinese (4.7%); Black (4.3%); Filipino (2.6%); Arab (1.9%); Latin American (2%); Southeast Asian (1.1%); West Asian (1%); Korean (0.6%); Japanese (0.3%); Multiracial/Others, excluding Métis (3.2%)

Language
- Official: English (55.97%); French (20.61%)
- Spoken: Mandarin (1.7%); Cantonese (1.63%); Punjabi (1.44%); Spanish (1.32%); Tagalog (1.24%); Arabic (1.21%); German (1.1%); Italian (1.08%); Others (12.7%)
- Language figures are from the 2016 Canadian census and based on total number of first language speakers (mother tongue), and not total number of individuals who may speak the language as a second (L2), third (L3), or more language. See knowledge of languages for this information.

Statistics Canada conducts a country-wide census that collects demographic data every five years in the first and sixth year of each decade. The 2021 Canadian census enumerated a total population of 36,991,981, an increase of around 5.2 percent over the 2016 figure. It is estimated that Canada's population surpassed 40 million in 2023 and 41 million in 2024. The main driver of population growth is immigration, with 6.2% of the country's population being made up of temporary residents as of 2023, or about 2.5 million people. As of July 1, 2026, Statistics Canada estimated Canada's population at 41,798,407. This was a preliminary population estimate rather than an official census count. 2024 saw the lowest recorded total fertility rate in the country's history, at around 1.25; this rate is among the lowest in the world.

Canada has one of the highest per-capita immigration rates in the world, driven mainly by economic policy and, to a lesser extent, family reunification. In 2024–2025, a total of 435,421 immigrants were admitted to Canada. New immigrants to Canada settle mostly in major urban areas such as Toronto, Montreal, and Vancouver. Canada also accepts large numbers of refugees, accounting for over 10 percent of annual global refugee resettlements.

== Population ==
Population density of Canadian provinces and territories >25 people/km^{2} 15–24.9 people/km^{2} 10–14.9 people/km^{2} 5–9.9 people/km^{2} 1–4.9 people/km^{2} <1 people/km^{2}

View source data.

The 2021 Canadian census had a total population count of 36,991,981 individuals, making up approximately 0.5% of the world's total population. A population estimate for 2024 put the total number of people in Canada at 41,012,563.

=== Provinces and territories ===
The vast majority of Canadians are positioned in a discontinuous band within approximately 300 km of the southern border with the United States; the most populated province is Ontario, followed by Quebec and British Columbia.

==== Cities ====
Largest cities or towns in Canada 2021 Census
Rank	Name	Province	Pop.	Rank	Name	Province	Pop.
1	Toronto	Ontario	2,794,356	11	Surrey	British Columbia	568,322
2	Montreal	Quebec	1,762,949	12	Quebec City	Quebec	549,459
3	Calgary	Alberta	1,306,784	13	Halifax	Nova Scotia	439,819
4	Ottawa	Ontario	1,017,449	14	Laval	Quebec	438,366
5	Edmonton	Alberta	1,010,899	15	London	Ontario	422,324
6	Winnipeg	Manitoba	749,607	16	Markham	Ontario	338,503
7	Mississauga	Ontario	717,961	17	Vaughan	Ontario	323,103
8	Vancouver	British Columbia	662,248	18	Gatineau	Quebec	291,041
9	Brampton	Ontario	656,480	19	Saskatoon	Saskatchewan	266,141
10	Hamilton	Ontario	569,353	20	Kitchener	Ontario	256,885

==== Census metropolitan areas ====
Largest metropolitan areas in Canada 2021 Canadian census
Rank	Name	Province	Pop.	Rank	Name	Province	Pop.
1	Toronto	Ontario	6,202,225	11	London	Ontario	543,551
2	Montreal	Quebec	4,291,732	12	Halifax	Nova Scotia	465,703
3	Vancouver	British Columbia	2,642,825	13	Niagara Region	Ontario	433,604
4	Ottawa–Gatineau	Ontario–Quebec	1,488,307	14	Windsor	Ontario	422,630
5	Calgary	Alberta	1,481,806	15	Oshawa	Ontario	415,311
6	Edmonton	Alberta	1,418,118	16	Victoria	British Columbia	397,237
7	Quebec City	Quebec	839,311	17	Saskatoon	Saskatchewan	317,480
8	Winnipeg	Manitoba	834,678	18	Regina	Saskatchewan	249,217
9	Hamilton	Ontario	785,184	19	Sherbrooke	Quebec	227,398
10	Waterloo Region	Ontario	575,847	20	Kelowna	British Columbia	222,162

=== Fertility rate ===
View source data.

The total fertility rate is the number of children born in a specific year cohort to the total number of women who can give birth in the country.

In 1971, the birth rate for the first time dipped below replacement and since then has not rebounded.

Canada's fertility rate hit a record low of 1.26 children born per woman in 2024, and tied it in 2025. This is Canada's third consecutive year with 'ultra-low fertility' (<1.30). In 2022, Canada also experienced the country's lowest absolute number of births in 17 years. From 2021 to 2022, Canada's TFR decreased by −7.4%, its largest drop in 50 years. The total birth rate is 10.17 births/1,000 population in 2022.

Total fertility rate	Years									
Total fertility rate	1861	1862	1863	1864	1865	1866	1867	1868	1869	1870
Total fertility rate	5.72	5.63	5.54	5.44	5.35	5.26	5.17	5.07	4.98	4.89
Total fertility rate	1871	1872	1873	1874	1875	1876	1877	1878	1879	1880
Total fertility rate	4.83	4.77	4.75	4.72	4.7	4.68	4.65	4.63	4.6	4.53
Total fertility rate	1881	1882	1883	1884	1885	1886	1887	1888	1899	1890
Total fertility rate	4.56	4.52	4.49	4.45	4.42	4.38	4.35	4.31	4.27	4.24
Total fertility rate	1891	1892	1893	1894	1895	1896	1897	1898	1899	1900
Total fertility rate	4.2	4.19	4.17	4.15	4.13	4.11	4.1	4.08	4.06	4.04
Total fertility rate	1901	1902	1903	1904	1905	1906	1907	1908	1909	1910
Total fertility rate	4.02	4.03	4.03	4.03	4.03	4.04	4.04	4.04	4.04	4.05
Total fertility rate	1911	1912	1913	1914	1915	1916	1917	1918	1919	1920
Total fertility rate	4.05	4	3.95	3.89	3.84	3.79	3.74	3.68	3.63	3.58
Total fertility rate	1921	1922	1923	1924	1925	1926	1927	1928	1929	1930
Total fertility rate	3.53	3.4	3.23	3.22	3.13	3.35	3.32	3.29	3.22	3.28
Total fertility rate	1931	1932	1933	1934	1935	1936	1937	1938	1939	1940
Total fertility rate	3.19	3.08	2.86	2.8	2.75	2.69	2.64	2.7	2.65	2.76
Total fertility rate	1941	1942	1943	1944	1945	1946	1947	1948	1949	1950
Total fertility rate	2.82	2.96	3.04	3	3.01	3.37	3.59	3.44	3.45	3.45
Total fertility rate	1961	1971	1981	1991	2001	2006	2011	2016	2021	-
Total fertility rate	3.81	2.11	1.65	1.67	1.52	1.6	1.63	1.58	1.46	–

==== Total fertility rates by provinces and territories ====
2025
Province/Territory	TFR
Nunavut	2.40
Saskatchewan	1.58
Manitoba	1.50
Alberta	1.42
Quebec	1.36
Northwest Territories	1.28
Canada	1.26
Ontario	1.23
New Brunswick	1.21
Prince Edward Island	1.18
Newfoundland and Labrador	1.08
Nova Scotia	1.07
British Columbia	1.04
Yukon	1.02

==== Mother's mean age at first birth ====
Canada is among late-childbearing countries, with the average age of mothers at the first birth being 31.3 years in 2020.

Average age of childbirth at first birth	Year										
Average age of childbirth at first birth	1945	1946	1947	1948	1949	1950	1951	1952	1953	1954	1955
Average age of childbirth at first birth	25.2	25.1	24.9	24.7	24.6	24.5	24.3	24.2	24.2	24.1	24.1
Average age of childbirth at first birth	1956	1957	1958	1959	1960	1961	1962	1963	1964	1965	1966
Average age of childbirth at first birth	24	23.9	23.8	23.7	23.7	23.6	23.6	23.6	23.6	23.5	23.5
Average age of childbirth at first birth	1967	1968	1969	1970	1971	1972	1973	1974	1975	1976	1977
Average age of childbirth at first birth	23.6	23.6	23.7	23.7	23.9	24	24.1	24.3	24.3	24.4	24.5
Average age of childbirth at first birth	1978	1979	1980	1981	1982	1983	1984	1985	1986	1987	1988
Average age of childbirth at first birth	24.7	24.8	24.9	25	25.1	25.3	25.4	25.5	25.6	25.7	25.8
Average age of childbirth at first birth	1989	1990	1991	1992	1993	1994	1995	1996	1997	1998	1999
Average age of childbirth at first birth	25.8	25.9	25.9	26.1	26.3	26.2	26.3	26.5	26.7	26.8	27
Average age of childbirth at first birth	2000	2001	2002	2003	2004	2005	2006	2007	2008	2009	2010
Average age of childbirth at first birth	27.1	27.3	27.5	27.8	27.9	28	28	28.1	28.1	28.2	28.4
Average age of childbirth at first birth	2011										
Average age of childbirth at first birth	28.5										

=== Historical population ===
Historical population (since Confederation)
Year	Pop.	±%
1871	3,689,257	—
1881	4,324,810	+17.2%
1891	4,833,239	+11.8%
1901	5,371,315	+11.1%
1911	7,206,643	+34.2%
1921	8,787,949	+21.9%
1931	10,374,196	+18.1%
1941	11,506,655	+10.9%
1951	14,009,429	+21.8%
1956	16,080,791	+14.8%
1961	18,238,247	+13.4%
1971	21,568,311	+18.3%
1976	22,992,604	+6.6%
1981	24,343,181	+5.9%
1986	25,309,331	+4.0%
1991	27,296,859	+7.9%
1996	28,846,761	+5.7%
2001	30,007,094	+4.0%
2006	31,612,897	+5.4%
2011	33,476,688	+5.9%
2016	35,151,728	+5.0%
2021	36,991,981	+5.2%

=== Population projection ===
According to the Organisation for Economic Co-operation and Development (OECD)/World Bank, the population of Canada increased from 1990 to 2008 by 5.6 million, a 20.4% growth in population, compared to 21.7% growth in the United States, 31.2% growth in Mexico, 8% in France and 27% or 1,423 million people globally. From 1991 to 2011, the population of the UK increased by 10%.

The population growth rate for Canada in 2022 was 0.75%.

High-growth scenario population projection (Statistics Canada, 2006)
Year	Pop.	±%
2021	39,110,000	—
2031	44,430,000	+13.6%
2041	49,900,000	+12.3%
2051	56,070,000	+12.4%
2061	63,000,000	+12.4%

=== Life expectancy ===
Life expectancy in Canada has consistently risen since the country's formation.

Life expectancy in Canada since 1831

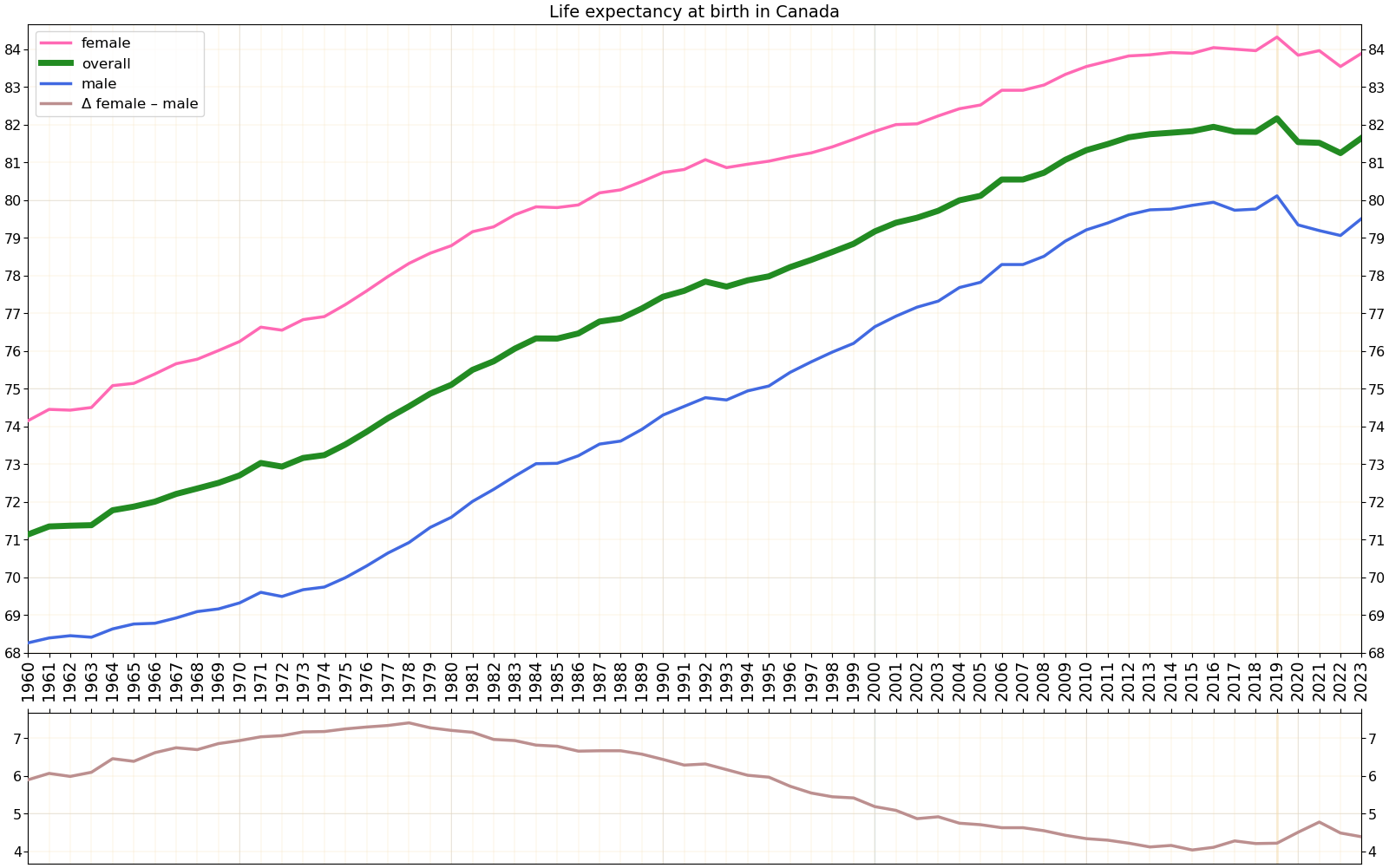
Life expectancy in Canada since 1960 by gender

Life expectancy	Year									
Life expectancy	1831	1841	1851	1861	1871	1881	1891	1901	1911	
Life expectancy	39.0	40.3	41.0	41.6	42.6	44.7	45.2	48.6	52.5	
Life expectancy	1921	1922	1923	1924	1925	1926	1927	1928	1929	
Life expectancy	57.0	57.0	56.9	58.8	59.2	57.2	58.6	58.4	57.9	
Life expectancy	1930	1931	1932	1933	1934	1935	1936	1937	1938	1939
Life expectancy	58.9	60.3	61.4	62.3	62.7	62.4	62.7	61.3	63.3	63.7
Life expectancy	1940	1941	1942	1943	1944	1945	1946	1947	1948	1949
Life expectancy	64.0	63.7	64.6	64.6	65.3	66.3	66.5	66.7	67.3	67.6
Life expectancy	1950	1950–55	1955–60	1960–65	1965–70	1970–75	1975–80	1980–85	1985–90	
Life expectancy	68.2	69.1	70.3	71.3	72.2	73.0	74.3	75.9	76.8	
Life expectancy	1990–95	1995–2000	2000–2005	2005–2010	2010–2015	2015–2020				
Life expectancy	77.8	78.6	79.7	80.8	81.8	83.7				

School life expectancy (primary to tertiary education)

total: 16 years
male: 16 years
female: 17 years (2016)

Infant mortality rate

total: 4.5 deaths/1,000 live births. Country comparison to the world: 180th
male: 4.8 deaths/1,000 live births
female: 4.2 deaths/1,000 live births (2017 est.)

Population pyramid of Canada over time from 1950 to 2026

=== Age characteristics ===
Population by Sex and Age Group (Census 10.V.2016) (To ensure confidentiality, the values, including totals are randomly rounded either up or down to a multiple of '5' or '10.' As a result, when these data are summed or grouped, the total value may not match the individual values since totals and sub-totals are independently rounded. Similarly, percentages, which are calculated on rounded data, may not necessarily add up to 100%.):

Age group	Male	Female	Total	%
Total	17 264 200	17 887 530	35 151 730	100
0–4	973 030	925 760	1 898 790	5.40
5–9	1 034 685	983 445	2 018 130	5.74
10–14	985 200	937 445	1 922 645	5.47
15–19	1 039 215	986 940	2 026 160	5.76
20–24	1 144 495	1 098 200	2 242 695	6.38
25–29	1 144 475	1 141 515	2 285 990	6.50
30–34	1 148 290	1 181 105	2 329 400	6.63
35–39	1 118 635	1 169 730	2 288 365	6.51
40–44	1 104 445	1 150 690	2 255 135	6.42
45–49	1 157 755	1 202 205	2 359 965	6.71
50–54	1 318 755	1 359 320	2 678 070	7.62
55–59	1 285 190	1 335 050	2 620 240	7.45
60–64	1 114 880	1 175 630	2 290 510	6.52
65–69	953 070	1 019 405	1 972 475	5.61
70–74	677 975	742 900	1 420 875	4.04
75–79	469 550	552 305	1 021 850	2.91
80–84	325 760	423 885	749 645	2.13
85–89	185 535	296 985	482 525	1.37
90–94	68 675	154 835	223 505	0.64
95–99	13 245	43 280	56 525	0.16
100+	1 340	6 895	8 230	0.02
Age group	Male	Female	Total	Percent
0–14	2 992 915	2 846 650	5 839 565	16.61
15–64	11 576 135	11 800 390	23 376 525	66.50
65+	2 695 150	3 240 490	5 935 640	16.89

Age structure

0–14 years: 15.99% (male 3,094,008/female 2,931,953)
15–24 years: 11.14% (male 2,167,013/female 2,032,064)
25–54 years: 39.81% (male 7,527,554/female 7,478,737)
55–64 years: 14.08% (male 2,624,474/female 2,682,858)
65 years and over: 18.98% (male 3,274,298/female 3,881,126) (2020 est.)

Median age

total: 41.8 years. Country comparison to the world: 40th
male: 40.6 years
female: 42.9 years (2020 est.)
Median age in 2011
total: 40.6 years
male: 39.6 years
female: 41.5 years (2011)
Median age by province and territory in 2011
1. Newfoundland and Labrador: 44.0
2. Nova Scotia: 43.7
3. New Brunswick: 43.7
4. Prince Edward Island: 42.8
5. Quebec: 41.9
6. British Columbia: 41.9
7. Ontario: 40.4
8. Yukon: 39.1
9. Manitoba: 38.4
10. Saskatchewan: 38.2
11. Alberta: 36.5
12. Northwest Territories: 32.3
13. Nunavut: 24.1

=== Sex ratio ===
at birth: 1.05 male(s)/female

0–14 years: 1.06 male(s)/female

15–24 years: 1.06 male(s)/female

25–54 years: 1.01 male(s)/female

55–64 years: 0.98 male(s)/female

65 years and over: 0.75 male(s)/female

total population: 0.98 male(s)/female (2022 est).

Dependency ratios

total dependency ratio: 47.3
youth dependency ratio: 23.5
elderly dependency ratio: 23.8
potential support ratio: 4.2 (2015 est.)

== Vital statistics ==
Notable events in Canadian demographics:

- 1947–1966 – Mid-20th century baby boom

	Average population (July 1)	Live births	Deaths	Natural change	Birth rate (per 1,000)	Death rate (per 1,000)	Natural change (per 1,000)	Crude Migration change (per 1,000)	Total fertility rate (Note: In fertility rates, 2.1 and above is a stable population and has been marked blue, 2 and below leads to an aging population and the result is that the population decreases.)
1900	5,500,000	150,000	89,000	61,000	27.2	16.2	11.0		
1901	5,600,000	175,000	79,000	96,000	31.2	14.1	17.1	0.8	
1902	5,760,000	180,000	77,000	103,000	31.3	13.4	17.9	9.9	4.8
1903	5,930,000	186,000	78,000	108,000	31.3	13.2	18.1	10.6	
1904	6,100,000	192,000	82,000	110,000	31.4	13.5	17.9	10.0	
1905	6,280,000	195,000	82,000	113,000	31.0	13.0	18.0	10.7	
1906	6,460,000	193,000	85,000	108,000	29.9	13.2	16.7	11.2	
1907	6,650,000	196,000	85,000	111,000	29.5	12.8	16.7	11.9	4.74
1908	6,850,000	208,000	86,000	122,000	30.3	12.6	17.7	11.5	
1909	7,040,000	213,000	90,000	123,000	30.2	12.8	17.4	9.6	
1910	7,250,000	220,000	95,000	125,000	30.4	13.1	17.3	11.7	
1911	7,460,000	225,000	100,000	125,000	30.1	13.4	16.7	11.5	4.7
1912	7,610,000	238,000	99,000	139,000	31.3	13.0	19.3	0.4	4.62
1913	7,760,000	246,000	102,000	144,000	31.7	13.1	19.6	−0.3	
1914	7,910,000	252,000	100,000	152,000	31.9	12.6	19.3	−0.3	
1915	8,060,000	257,000	101,000	156,000	31.9	12.5	19.4	−0.8	
1916	8,220,000	252,000	107,000	145,000	30.7	13.0	17.7	1.8	
1917	8,380,000	244,000	106,000	138,000	29.1	12.7	16.4	2.7	4.26
1918	8,450,000	243,000	134,000	109,000	28.8	15.9	12.9	−4.6	
1919	8,710,000	241,000	119,000	122,000	27.7	13.7	14.0	15.9	
1920	8,880,000	259,000	118,000	141,000	29.2	13.3	15.9	3.2	
1921	9,060,000	265,000	105,000	160,000	29.3	11.6	17.7	2.2	3.98
1922	9,230,000	261,000	107,000	154,000	28.3	11.6	16.7	1.7	3.86
1923	9,400,000	251,000	111,000	140,000	26.7	11.8	14.9	3.2	
1924	9,560,000	255,000	104,000	151,000	26.7	10.9	15.8	0.9	
1925	9,730,000	254,000	104,000	150,000	26.1	10.7	15.4	2.1	
1926	9,890,000	244,000	113,000	131,000	24.7	11.4	13.3	2.9	
1927	10,040,000	244,000	110,000	134,000	24.3	11.0	13.3	1.6	3.32
1928	10,190,000	246,000	114,000	132,000	24.1	11.2	12.9	1.8	
1929	10,350,000	243,000	118,000	125,000	23.5	11.4	12.1	3.4	3.22
1930	10,498,000	251,000	113,000	138,000	23.9	10.8	13.1	1.0	3.28
1931	10,630,000	247,000	108,000	139,000	23.2	10.2	13.0	−0.6	3.2
1932	10,794,000	243,000	108,000	135,000	22.5	10.0	12.5	2.7	3.08
1933	10,919,000	229,000	106,000	123,000	21.0	9.7	11.3	0.1	2.86
1934	11,029,000	228,296	105,277	123,019	20.7	9.5	11.2	−1.2	2.8
1935	11,135,000	228,396	109,724	118,672	20.5	9.9	10.6	−1.1	2.76
1936	11,242,000	227,980	111,111	116,869	20.3	9.9	10.4	−0.9	2.70
1937	11,339,000	227,878	118,019	109,859	20.1	10.4	9.7	−1.1	2.65
1938	11,448,000	237,091	110,647	126,444	20.7	9.7	11.0	−1.5	2.70
1939	11,565,000	237,991	112,729	125,262	20.6	9.7	10.9	−0.8	2.65
1940	11,682,000	252,577	114,717	137,860	21.6	9.8	11.8	−1.8	2.77
1941	11,810,000	263,993	118,797	145,196	22.4	10.1	12.3	−1.5	2.83
1942	11,962,000	281,569	117,110	164,459	23.5	9.8	13.7	−1.0	2.96
1943	12,125,000	292,943	122,640	170,303	24.2	10.1	14.1	−0.7	3.04
1944	12,291,000	283,967	120,393	163,574	24.0	9.8	14.2	−0.7	3.01
1945	12,441,000	300,570	117,319	183,251	24.3	9.5	14.8	−2.7	3.02
1946	12,316,000	331,471	115,358	216,113	26.9	9.4	17.5	−27.6	3.37
1947	12,576,000	359,943	118,157	241,786	28.6	9.4	19.2	1.5	3.60
1948	12,852,000	348,226	119,866	228,360	27.1	9.3	17.8	3.7	3.44
1949	13,475,000	367,092	124,567	242,525	27.2	9.2	18.0	28.2	3.46
1950	13,737,000	372,009	124,220	247,789	27.1	9.0	18.0	1.1	3.46
1951	14,050,000	381,092	125,823	255,269	27.1	9.0	18.2	4.1	3.50
1952	14,496,000	403,559	126,385	277,174	27.8	8.7	19.1	11.7	3.64
1953	14,886,000	417,884	127,791	290,093	28.1	8.6	19.5	6.7	3.72
1954	15,330,000	436,198	124,855	311,343	28.5	8.1	20.3	8.7	3.83
1955	15,736,000	442,937	128,476	314,461	28.1	8.2	20.0	5.8	3.83
1956	16,123,000	450,739	131,961	318,778	28.0	8.2	19.8	4.2	3.86
1957	16,677,000	469,093	136,579	332,514	28.1	8.2	19.9	13.3	3.93
1958	17,120,000	470,118	135,201	334,917	27.5	7.9	19.6	6.3	3.88
1959	17,522,000	479,275	139,913	339,362	27.4	8.0	19.4	3.5	3.94
1960	17,909,000	478,551	139,693	338,858	26.7	7.8	18.9	2.7	3.895
1961	18,271,000	475,700	140,985	334,715	26.0	7.7	18.3	1.5	3.840
1962	18,614,000	469,693	143,699	325,994	25.2	7.7	17.5	0.9	3.767
1963	18,964,000	465,767	147,367	318,400	24.6	7.8	16.8	1.7	3.694
1964	19,325,000	452,915	145,850	307,065	23.4	7.5	15.9	2.8	3.449
1965	19,678,000	418,595	148,939	269,656	21.3	7.6	13.7	4.2	3.192
1966	20,048,000	387,710	149,863	237,847	19.3	7.5	11.9	6.6	2.749
1967	20,412,000	370,894	150,283	220,611	18.2	7.4	10.8	7.0	2.528
1968	20,729,000	364,310	153,196	211,114	17.6	7.4	10.2	5.1	2.386
1969	21,028,000	369,647	154,477	215,170	17.6	7.3	10.2	4.0	2.334
1970	21,324,000	371,988	155,961	216,027	17.4	7.3	10.1	3.8	2.258
1971	21,962,032	362,187	157,272	204,915	16.5	7.2	9.3	19.8	2.141
1972	22,218,463	347,319	162,413	184,906	15.6	7.3	8.3	3.2	1.98
1973	22,491,777	343,373	164,039	179,334	15.3	7.3	8.0	4.2	1.89
1974	22,807,969	350,650	166,794	183,856	15.4	7.3	8.1	5.8	1.837
1975	23,143,275	359,323	167,176	192,147	15.5	7.2	8.3	6.2	1.824
1976	23,449,808	359,987	167,009	192,978	15.4	7.1	8.2	4.9	1.796
1977	23,725,843	361,400	167,498	193,902	15.2	7.1	8.2	3.4	1.782
1978	23,963,203	358,852	168,179	190,673	15.0	7.0	8.0	1.9	1.768
1979	24,201,544	366,064	168,183	197,881	15.1	6.9	8.2	1.6	1.754
1980	24,515,667	370,709	171,473	199,236	15.1	7.0	8.1	4.7	1.74
1981	24,819,915	371,346	171,029	200,317	15.0	6.9	8.1	4.2	1.7
1982	25,116,942	373,082	174,413	198,669	14.9	6.9	7.9	3.9	1.69
1983	25,366,451	373,689	174,484	199,205	14.7	6.9	7.9	1.9	1.68
1984	25,607,053	377,031	175,727	201,304	14.7	6.9	7.9	1.5	1.65
1985	25,842,116	375,727	181,323	194,404	14.5	7.0	7.5	1.6	1.67
1986	26,100,278	372,913	184,224	188,689	14.3	7.1	7.2	2.7	1.675
1987	26,446,601	369,742	184,953	184,789	14.0	7.0	7.0	6.1	1.68
1988	26,791,747	376,795	190,011	186,784	14.1	7.1	7.0	5.9	1.68
1989	27,276,781	392,661	190,965	201,696	14.4	7.0	7.4	10.4	1.77
1990	27,691,138	405,486	191,973	213,513	14.6	6.9	7.7	7.3	1.83
1991	28,037,420	403,816	195,569	208,247	14.4	7.0	7.4	5.0	1.72
1992	28,371,264	399,109	196,535	202,574	14.1	6.9	7.1	4.7	1.71
1993	28,684,764	389,037	204,912	184,125	13.5	7.1	6.4	4.5	1.68
1994	29,000,663	386,243	207,077	179,166	13.3	7.1	6.1	4.8	1.69
1995	29,302,311	378,685	210,733	167,952	12.9	7.2	5.7	4.6	1.67
1996	29,610,218	366,833	212,880	153,953	12.4	7.2	5.2	5.2	1.63
1997	29,905,948	349,543	215,669	133,874	11.7	7.2	4.4	5.5	1.57
1998	30,155,173	342,966	218,091	124,875	11.4	7.2	4.1	4.2	1.56
1999	30,401,286	337,821	219,530	118,291	11.1	7.2	3.9	4.2	1.54
2000	30,685,730	328,596	218,062	110,534	10.7	7.1	3.6	5.7	1.51
2001	31,020,902	334,615	219,538	115,077	10.8	7.1	3.7	7.1	1.54
2002	31,360,079	329,894	223,603	106,291	10.5	7.1	3.4	7.4	1.51
2003	31,644,028	336,352	226,169	110,183	10.6	7.1	3.4	5.6	1.54
2004	31,940,655	339,012	226,584	112,428	10.6	7.1	3.5	5.8	1.55
2005	32,243,753	345,365	230,132	115,233	10.6	7.1	3.5	5.9	1.57
2006	32,571,174	357,921	228,079	129,842	10.9	7.0	3.9	6.2	1.61
2007	32,888,886	370,369	235,217	135,152	11.2	7.2	4.0	5.7	1.66
2008	33,247,298	381,860	238,617	143,243	11.4	7.2	4.2	6.6	1.69
2009	33,630,069	384,651	238,418	146,233	11.3	7.1	4.2	7.2	1.68
2010	34,005,905	379,191	240,075	139,116	11.1	7.1	4.0	7.1	1.64
2011	34,339,221	379,244	243,511	135,733	11.0	7.1	3.9	5.9	1.62
2012	34,713,395	383,101	246,596	136,505	11.0	7.1	3.9	7.0	1.62
2013	35,080,992	381,054	252,338	128,716	10.8	7.2	3.6	7.0	1.60
2014	35,434,066	384,577	258,821	125,756	10.8	7.3	3.5	6.5	1.61
2015	35,704,498	382,979	264,333	118,646	10.7	7.4	3.3	4.1	1.60
2016	36,110,803	384,023	267,213	116,810	10.6	7.4	3.2	8.1	1.59
2017	36,545,075	377,627	278,298	99,329	10.3	7.6	2.7	9.2	1.54
2018	37,072,620	374,617	285,675	88,942	10.1	7.7	2.4	12.0	1.50
2019	37,618,495	372,978	285,270	87,708	9.9	7.6	2.3	12.4	1.47
2020	38,028,638	361,582	307,205	54,377	9.5	8.1	1.4	9.4	1.41
2021	38,239,864	372,564	311,942	60,622	9.7	8.2	1.6	4.2	1.44
2022	38,945,628	355,134	326,483	28,651	9.1	8.4	0.7	17.6	1.33
2023	40,022,704	352,644	337,708	14,936	8.8	8.4	0.4	29.0	1.27
2024	41,162,593	365,737	345,829	18,757	8.9	8.4	0.5	28.4	1.27
2025	41,608,982	371,373	340,167	31,206	8.9	8.2	0.7	3.8	1.28(e)
2026	41,798,407								1.28 (e)

In 2024, more than two in five newborns (42.3%) in Canada had a foreign-born mother (i.e., a mother who was born outside Canada).

View source data.
View source data.

=== Current vital statistics ===
Period	Live births	Deaths	Natural increase
January–June 2025	183,684	168,590	+15,094
January–June 2026	184,121	171,750	+12,371
Difference	▲ +437 (+0.2%)	▲ +3,160 (+1.9%)	▼ –2,723

Note: all numbers in this table are provisional. While data for at least two years ago may be final, newer data for recent days are subject to change in the future. For example, as of September 25, 2024, the numbers are final up to December 2021, updated from January 2022 to March 2024 and preliminary from April 2024.

== Employment ==
Canadian Unemployment Rates, June 2025
Age	Unemployment Rate
15–24	14.2%
25-54	5.8%
55+	4.5%
Total (15+)	6.9%

Unemployment Rates, June 2025
Age Group	Percent Unemployed
Youth (15–24)	14.2%
Core-age (25–54)	5.8%
55+	5.4%
Total (15+)	6.9%

Unemployment, youth ages 15–24 (2020 est.)

total: 20.2%
male: 20.9%
female: 19.4%

== Ethnicity and visible minorities ==
=== Canadians as ethnic group by province ===
All citizens of Canada are classified as "Canadians" as defined by Canada's nationality laws. "Canadian" as an ethnic group has since 1996 been added to census questionnaires for possible ancestral origin or descent. "Canadian" was included as an example on the English questionnaire and "Canadien" as an example on the French questionnaire. The majority of respondents to this selection are from the eastern part of the country that was first settled. Respondents generally are visibly European (Anglophones and Francophones) and no longer self-identify directly with their ethnic ancestral origins. This response is attributed to a multitude of reasons such as generational distance from ancestral lineage, intermarriage with a variety of ethnic groups, and loss of ancestral language.

Province / Territory	Percent Canadians	Total Canadians
Alberta	22.7%	902,310
British Columbia	19.0%	866,530
Manitoba	18.2%	232,660
New Brunswick	57.8%	415,810
Newfoundland and Labrador	43.4%	271,345
Nova Scotia	42.6%	387,360
Ontario	23.5%	3,109,770
Prince Edward Island	45.0%	60,000
Quebec	60.1%	4,474,115
Saskatchewan	25.0%	274,580
Canada total	32.3%	11,136,134

=== Ethnic origin ===
Ethnic composition from 1981 to 2021

Visible minorities over time including projections

Ethnic composition by age group, 2021

Visible minorities as population pyramid, 2016

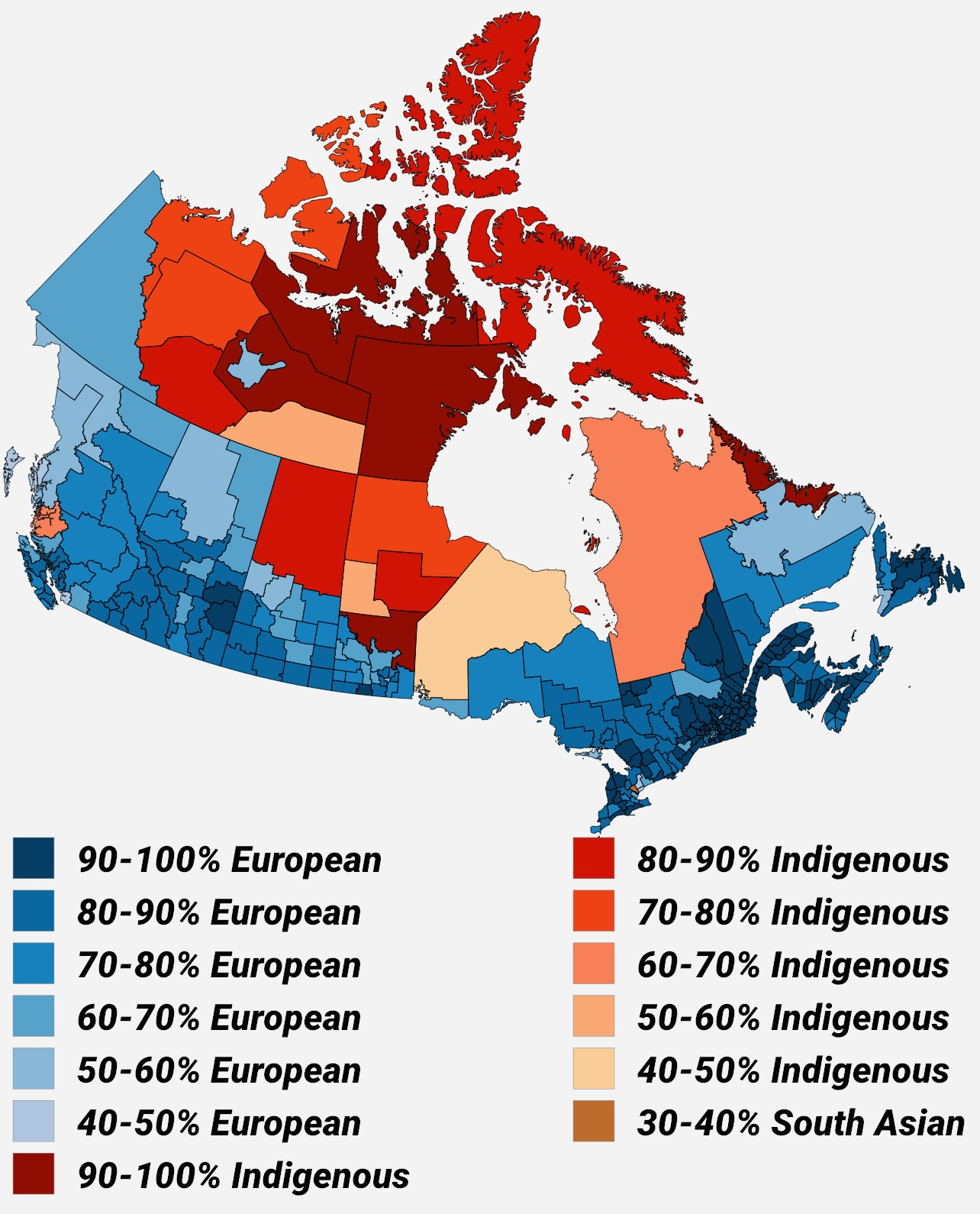
Largest pan-ethnicity in Canada by census division, 2021

According to the 2021 Canadian census, over 450 "ethnic or cultural origins" were self-reported by Canadians. The major panethnic groups chosen were: European (52.5%), North American (22.9%), Asian (19.3%), North American Indigenous (6.1%), African (3.8%), Latin, Central and South American (2.5%), Caribbean (2.1%), Oceanian (0.3%), and Other (6%). Statistics Canada reports that 35.5% of the population reported multiple ethnic origins, thus the overall total is greater than 100%. (Note: The 2021 census on ethnic or cultural origins, Statistics Canada states: "Given the fluid nature of this concept and the changes made to this question, 2021 Census data on ethnic or cultural origins are not comparable to data from previous censuses and should not be used to measure the growth or decline of the various groups associated with these origins".)

The country's ten largest self-reported specific ethnic or cultural origins in 2021 were Canadian (Note: All citizens of Canada are classified as "Canadians" as defined by Canada's nationality laws. "Canadian" as an ethnic group has since 1996 been added to census questionnaires for possible ancestral origin or descent. "Canadian" was included as an example on the English questionnaire and "Canadien" as an example on the French questionnaire. "The majority of respondents to this selection are from the eastern part of the country that was first settled. Respondents generally are visibly European (Anglophones and Francophones) and no longer self-identify with their ethnic ancestral origins. This response is attributed to a multitude of reasons such as generational distance from ancestral lineage.") (accounting for 15.6 percent of the population), followed by English (14.7 percent), Irish (12.1 percent), Scottish (12.1 percent), French (11.0 percent), German (8.1 percent), Indian (5.1 percent), (Note: Statistic includes all persons with ethnic or cultural origin responses with ancestry to the nation of India, including "Anglo-Indian" (3,340), "Bengali" (26,675), "Goan" (9,700), "Gujarati" (36,970), "Indian" (1,347,715), "Jatt" (22,785), "Kashmiri" (6,165), "Maharashtrian" (4,125), "Malayali" (12,490), "Punjabi" (279,950), "Tamil" (102,170), and "Telugu" (6,670)".) Chinese (4.7 percent), Italian (4.3 percent), and Ukrainian (3.5 percent).

Of the 36.3 million people enumerated in 2021 approximately 25.4 million reported being "White", representing 69.8 percent of the population. The Indigenous population representing 5 percent or 1.8 million individuals, grew by 9.4 percent compared to the non-Indigenous population, which grew by 5.3 percent from 2016 to 2021. One out of every four Canadians or 26.5 percent of the population belonged to a non-White and non-Indigenous visible minority, (Note: Indigenous peoples are not considered a visible minority in Statistics Canada calculations. Visible minorities are defined by Statistics Canada as "persons, other than aboriginal peoples, who are non-Caucasian in race or non-White in colour".) the largest of which in 2021 were South Asian (2.6 million people; 7.1 percent), Chinese (1.7 million; 4.7 percent) and Black (1.5 million; 4.3 percent).

As data is completely self-reported, and reporting individuals may have varying definitions of "Ethnic origin" (or may not know their ethnic origin), these figures should not be considered an exact record of the relative prevalence of different ethno-cultural ancestries but rather how Canadians self-identify.

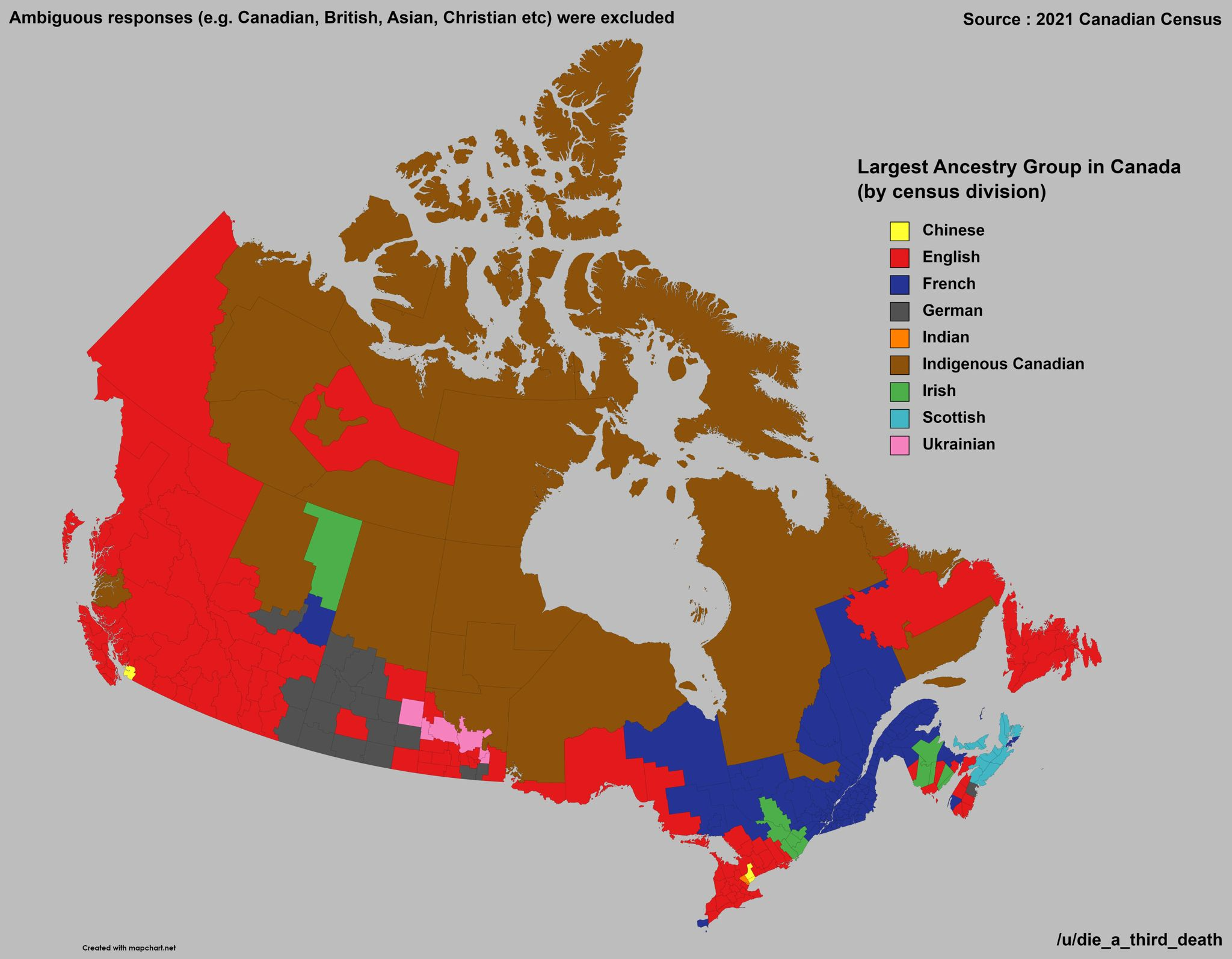
Largest self reported ethnic and cultural origins by census division, 2021

Data from this section from Statistics Canada, 2021.

Ethnic origin	%	Population
Canadian	15.6%	5,677,205
English	14.7%	5,322,830
Irish	12.1%	4,413,120
Scottish	12.1%	4,392,200
French	11.0%	3,985,945
German	8.1%	2,955,695
Indian	5.1%	1,855,415
Chinese	4.7%	1,713,870
Italian	4.3%	1,546,390
Ukrainian	3.5%	1,258,635
Dutch	2.7%	988,585
Polish	2.7%	982,820
Québécois	2.7%	981,635
British Isles, n.o.s.	2.6%	981,635
Filipino	2.5%	925,490
French Canadian	2.5%	906,315
Caucasian (White), n.o.s.	1.9%	691,260
First Nations, n.o.s.	1.7%	632,340
Métis	1.5%	560,335
European, n.o.s.	1.5%	551,910

The most common ethnic origins per province are as follows in 2006 (total responses; only percentages 10% or higher shown; ordered by percentage of "Canadian"):

- Quebec (7,723,525): Canadian (59.1%), French (29.1%)
- New Brunswick (735,835): Canadian (50.3%), French (27.2%), English (25.9%), Irish (21.6%), Scottish (19.9%)
- Newfoundland and Labrador (507,265): Canadian (49.0%), English (43.4%), Irish (21.8%)
- Nova Scotia (906,170): Canadian (39.1%), Scottish (31.2%), English (30.8%), Irish (22.3%), French (17.0%), German (10.8%)
- Prince Edward Island (137,375): Scottish (39.3%), Canadian (36.8%), English (31.1%), Irish (30.4%), French (21.1%)
- Ontario (12,651,795): Canadian (23.3%), English (23.1%), Scottish (16.4%), Irish (16.4%), French (10.8%)
- Alberta (3,567,980): English (24.9%), Canadian (21.8%), German (19.2%), Scottish (18.8%), Irish (15.8%), French (11.1%)
- Manitoba (1,174,345): English (21.8%), German (18.6%), Canadian (18.5%), Scottish (18.0%), Ukrainian (14.9%), Irish (13.2%), French (12.6%), North American Indian (10.6%)
- Saskatchewan (1,008,760): German (28.6%), English (24.9%), Scottish (18.9%), Canadian (18.8%), Irish (15.5%), Ukrainian (13.5%), French (12.2%), North American Indian (12.1%)
- British Columbia (4,324,455): English (27.7%), Scottish (19.3%), Canadian (19.1%), German (13.1%), Chinese (10.7%)
- Yukon (33,320): English (28.5%), Scottish (25.0%), Irish (22.0%), North American Indian (21.8%), Canadian (21.8%), German (15.6%), French (13.1%)
- Northwest Territories (40,800): North American Indian (37.0%), Scottish (13.9%), English (13.7%), Canadian (12.8%), Irish (11.9%), Inuit (11.7%)
- Nunavut (31,700): Inuit (85.4%)

Italics indicates either that this response is dominant within this province, or that this province has the highest ratio (percentage) of this response among provinces.

=== Visible minority population ===
Visible and non-visible minority populations by group, 1981–1996
Group	1981 census		1986 census		1991 census		1996 census	
Group	Total	%	Total	%	Total	%	Total	%
Visible minority	1,131,825	4.7%	1,577,710	6.3%	2,525,480	9.4%	3,197,480	11.2%
South Asian	223,235	0.9%	300,545	1.2%	505,515	1.9%	670,590	2.4%
Chinese (East Asian)	299,915	1.2%	390,590	1.6%	626,435	2.3%	860,150	3%
Black	239,455	1%	355,385	1.4%	504,290	1.9%	573,860	2%
Filipino	75,485	0.3%	102,360	0.4%	169,150	0.6%	234,195	0.8%
Latin American	50,230	0.2%	60,975	0.2%	134,535	0.5%	176,970	0.6%
Arab/West Asian	112,435	0.5%	149,665	0.6%	289,755	1.1%	244,665	0.9%
Southeast Asian (except Filipino)	53,910	0.2%	86,945	0.3%	132,415	0.5%	172,765	0.6%
Korean (East Asian)	22,570	0.1%	29,205	0.1%	45,535	0.2%	64,835	0.2%
Japanese (East Asian)	46,060	0.2%	52,880	0.2%	63,860	0.2%	68,135	0.2%
Multiple visible minorities			40,500	0.2%	48,545	0.2%	61,575	0.2%
Visible minority, n.i.e.					5,440	0%	69,745	0.2%
Other	8,530	0%	8,660	0%				
Not a visible minority	22,951,670	95.3%	23,444,300	93.7%	24,468,560	90.6%	25,330,645	88.8%
Indigenous (see breakdown below)	491,465	2%	711,725	2.8%	1,016,340	3.8%	799,005	2.8%
Non-Indigenous & Non-Visible Minority (European/White) (Note: 1981–2016 censuses and future projections: Statistic includes all persons that did not make up part of a visible minority or an indigenous identity.; 2021 census: Statistic includes all persons belonging to the "White" population group.)	22,460,205	93.3%	22,732,575	90.9%	23,452,220	86.9%	24,531,640	86%
Total population in private households	24,083,495	100%	25,022,010	100%	26,994,040	100%	28,528,125	100%

Note: Indigenous population decline between 1991 and 1996 censuses attributed to change in criteria in census count; "the 1996 Royal Commission on Aboriginal Peoples used a more restrictive definition of Aboriginal".

Visible and non-visible minority populations by group, 2001–2021
Group	2001 census		2006 census		2011 survey		2016 census		2021 census	
Group	Total	%	Total	%	Total	%	Total	%	Total	%
Visible minority	3,983,845	13.4%	5,068,095	16.2%	6,264,750	19.1%	7,674,580	22.3%	9,639,205	26.5%
South Asian	917,075	3.1%	1,262,865	4%	1,567,400	4.8%	1,924,635	5.6%	2,571,400	7.1%
Chinese (East Asian)	1,029,395	3.5%	1,216,565	3.9%	1,324,750	4%	1,577,060	4.6%	1,715,770	4.7%
Black	662,215	2.2%	783,795	2.5%	945,665	2.9%	1,198,540	3.5%	1,574,870	4.3%
Filipino	308,575	1%	410,695	1.3%	619,310	1.9%	780,125	2.3%	957,355	2.6%
Arab	194,685	0.7%	265,550	0.9%	380,620	1.2%	523,235	1.5%	694,015	1.9%
Latin American	216,980	0.7%	304,245	1%	381,280	1.2%	447,325	1.3%	726,820	2%
Southeast Asian (except Filipino)	198,880	0.7%	239,935	0.8%	312,075	0.9%	313,260	0.9%	390,340	1.1%
West Asian	109,285	0.4%	156,700	0.5%	206,840	0.6%	264,305	0.8%	360,495	1%
Korean (East Asian)	100,660	0.3%	141,890	0.5%	161,130	0.5%	188,710	0.5%	218,140	0.6%
Japanese (East Asian)	73,315	0.2%	81,300	0.3%	87,270	0.3%	92,920	0.3%	98,890	0.3%
Multiple visible minorities	73,875	0.2%	133,120	0.4%	171,935	0.5%	232,375	0.7%	331,805	0.9%
Visible minority, n.i.e.	98,915	0.3%	71,420	0.2%	106,475	0.3%	132,090	0.4%	172,885	0.5%
Not a visible minority	25,655,185	86.6%	26,172,935	83.8%	26,587,575	80.9%	26,785,480	77.7%	26,689,275	73.5%
Indigenous (see breakdown below)	976,305	3.3%	1,172,785	3.8%	1,400,685	4.3%	1,673,785	4.9%	1,807,250	5%
Non-Indigenous & Non-Visible Minority (European/White)	24,678,880	83.3%	25,000,150	80%	25,186,890	76.7%	25,111,695	72.9%	24,882,025	68.5%
Total population in private households	29,639,030	100%	31,241,030	100%	32,852,320	100%	34,460,065	100%	36,328,480	100%

=== Indigenous population ===
Indigenous population in Canada, 1996–2021 censuses
Group	1996		2001		2006		2011		2016		2021	
Group	%	Total	%	Total	%	Total	%	Total	%	Total	%	Total
Total Indigenous	2.8%	799,005	3.3%	976,305	3.8%	1,172,785	4.3%	1,400,685	4.9%	1,673,780	5%	1,807,250
First Nations	1.8%	529,040	2.1%	608,850	2.2%	698,025	2.6%	851,560	2.8%	977,230	2.9%	1,048,405
Métis	0.7%	204,115	1.0%	292,305	1.2%	389,780	1.4%	451,795	1.7%	587,545	1.7%	624,220
Inuit	0.14%	40,220			0.16%	50,485	0.2%	59,445	0.2%	65,025	0.2%	70,540

Note: Other Indigenous and mixed Indigenous groups are not listed as their own, but they are all accounted for in total Indigenous

=== Future projections ===
Statistics Canada projects that visible minorities will make up between 38.2% and 43.0% of the total Canadian population by 2041, compared with 26.5% in 2021. Among the working-age population (15 to 64 years), meanwhile, visible minorities are projected to represent between 42.1% and 47.3% of Canada's total population, compared to 28.5% in 2021.

Pan−ethnic Origin Projections (2031): 1. European (59.8%); 2. South Asian (9.82%); 3. East Asian (7.15%); 4. Indigenous (5.69%); 5. African (5.46%); 6. Southeast Asian (4.60%); 7. Middle Eastern (4.13%); 8. Latin American (1.88%); 9. Other (1.48%)	Pan−ethnic Origin Projections (2036): 1. European (56.2%); 2. South Asian (10.9%); 3. East Asian (7.53%); 4. Indigenous (5.84%); 5. African (6.03%); 6. Southeast Asian (5.08%); 7. Middle Eastern (4.68%); 8. Latin American (2.03%); 9. Other (1.62%)	Pan−ethnic Origin Projections (2041): 1. European (53.1%); 2. South Asian (11.9%); 3. East Asian (7.85%); 4. Indigenous (5.97%); 5. African (6.57%); 6. Southeast Asian (5.54%); 7. Middle Eastern (5.19%); 8. Latin American (2.17%); 9. Other (1.76%)

Pan−ethnic Origin Projections (2031−2041)
	2031		2036		2041	
	Population	%	Population	%	Population	%
European	26,085,000	59.79%	25,749,000	56.25%	25,296,000	53.07%
South Asian	4,283,000	9.82%	5,010,000	10.94%	5,658,000	11.87%
East Asian	3,120,000	7.15%	3,445,000	7.53%	3,740,000	7.85%
African	2,381,000	5.46%	2,762,000	6.03%	3,134,000	6.57%
Indigenous	2,484,000	5.69%	2,673,000	5.84%	2,848,000	5.97%
Southeast Asian	2,009,000	4.6%	2,324,000	5.08%	2,640,000	5.54%
Middle Eastern	1,801,000	4.13%	2,141,000	4.68%	2,475,000	5.19%
Latin American	821,000	1.88%	931,000	2.03%	1,036,000	2.17%
Other	644,000	1.48%	742,000	1.62%	841,000	1.76%
Projected; Canadian; Population	43,629,000	100%	45,776,000	100%	47,668,000	100%

== Languages ==
=== Knowledge of language ===
Top ten spoken languages in Canada 2021 census (Note: The question on knowledge of languages allows for multiple responses. The following figures are from the 2021 Canadian Census.)
Language	Percent
English	87.06%
French	29.08%
Chinese (Note: 2021 census: Combined responses of the Chinese languages, including Mandarin (987,300), Cantonese (724,925), Min Nan, Hakka, Wu (Shanghainese), Min Dong, Chinese, n.o.s., (Note: n.o.s. – not otherwise specified) and Chinese languages, n.i.e. (Note: n.i.e. – not included elsewhere))	4.21%
Hindustani (Note: 2021 census: Combined responses of Hindi (761,425) and Urdu (414,870) as they form mutually intelligible registers of the Hindustani language.)	3.24%
Spanish	3.22%
Punjabi	2.59%
Arabic	2.31%
Tagalog	2.03%
Italian	1.51%
German	1.15%

The question on knowledge of languages allows for multiple responses, and first appeared on the 1991 Canadian census. (Note: The 1991 Census was the first to ask Canadians whether they could conduct a conversation in a language other than English or French) The following figures are from the 1991 Canadian census, 2001 Canadian census, 2011 Canadian census, and the 2021 Canadian census.

Knowledge of Languages in Canada
Language	2021		2011		2001		1991	
Language	Pop.	%	Pop.	%	Pop.	%	Pop.	%
English	31,628,570	87.06%	28,360,235	85.63%	25,246,220	85.18%	22,505,415	83.37%
French	10,563,235	29.08%	9,960,585	30.07%	9,178,100	30.97%	8,508,960	31.52%
Chinese	1,528,860	4.21%	1,297,505	3.92%	1,028,445	3.47%	557,305	2.06%
Hindustani	1,176,295	3.24%	576,165	1.74%	366,740	1.24%	163,930	0.61%
Spanish	1,171,450	3.22%	873,395	2.64%	610,580	2.06%	402,430	1.49%
Punjabi	942,170	2.59%	545,730	1.65%	338,720	1.14%	167,925	0.62%
Arabic	838,045	2.31%	470,965	1.42%	290,280	0.98%	164,380	0.61%
Tagalog	737,565	2.03%	491,075	1.48%	244,690	0.83%	136,975	0.51%
Italian	547,655	1.51%	595,600	1.8%	680,970	2.3%	701,910	2.6%
German	419,195	1.15%	525,480	1.59%	635,520	2.14%	684,955	2.54%
Portuguese	336,865	0.93%	266,950	0.81%	264,990	0.89%	254,465	0.94%
Persian (Note: 2021 census: Combined responses of Iranian Persian (222,160), Dari, and Persian (Farsi), n.o.s., as they form mutually intelligible registers of the Persian language, and as they were all categorized under "Persian" in previous censuses.)	330,725	0.91%	196,110	0.59%	111,700	0.38%	49,380	0.18%
Russian	309,235	0.85%	230,755	0.7%	157,455	0.53%	84,050	0.31%
Tamil	237,890	0.65%	179,465	0.54%	111,580	0.38%	37,330	0.14%
Vietnamese	232,800	0.64%	192,070	0.58%	165,645	0.56%	113,115	0.42%
Gujarati	209,410	0.58%	118,950	0.36%	80,835	0.27%	54,210	0.2%
Polish	204,460	0.56%	217,735	0.66%	249,695	0.84%	239,575	0.89%
Korean	203,885	0.56%	149,035	0.45%	91,610	0.31%	40,230	0.15%
Serbo-Croatian (Note: Including Bosnian, Croatian, Serbian, and Serbo-Croatian, n.i.e.)	155,775	0.43%	154,700	0.47%	153,085	0.52%	100,541	0.37%
Greek	145,060	0.4%	150,620	0.45%	158,800	0.54%	161,320	0.6%
Haitian Creole	134,895	0.37%	128,555	0.39%	76,140	0.26%	49,970	0.19%
Ukrainian	131,655	0.36%	144,260	0.44%	200,520	0.68%	249,535	0.92%
Bengali	120,605	0.33%	69,490	0.21%	34,650	0.12%	N/A	<0.1%
Romanian	116,520	0.32%	97,180	0.29%	60,520	0.2%	30,520	0.11%
Dutch	107,985	0.3%	135,085	0.41%	157,875	0.53%	173,290	0.64%
Cree (Note: 2021 census: Total number of speakers of the Cree-Innu languages, previously categorized under "Cree" in past censuses.)	105,850	0.29%	96,690	0.29%	97,200	0.33%	93,825	0.35%
Japanese	98,070	0.27%	74,690	0.23%	65,030	0.22%	45,370	0.17%
Hebrew	83,205	0.23%	70,695	0.21%	63,675	0.21%	52,450	0.19%
Turkish	78,500	0.22%	44,080	0.13%	32,520	0.11%	N/A	<0.1%
Malayalam	77,910	0.21%	22,125	0.07%	9,185	0.03%	N/A	<0.1%
Hungarian	64,625	0.18%	73,695	0.22%	89,230	0.3%	97,410	0.36%
Ilocano	61,680	0.17%	21,880	0.07%	N/A	<0.03%	N/A	<0.1%
Somali	59,005	0.16%	37,115	0.11%	N/A	<0.03%	N/A	<0.1%
Swahili	57,295	0.16%	31,690	0.1%	25,300	0.09%	N/A	<0.1%
Telugu	54,685	0.15%	12,645	0.04%	N/A	<0.03%	N/A	<0.1%
Armenian	44,500	0.12%	36,235	0.11%	32,900	0.11%	20,515	0.08%

=== Mother tongue ===
Languages in Canada (Mother Tongue) 2016 Census
Language	Percent
English	55.97%
Non-official	21.06%
French	20.61%
English and French	0.48%

Languages of Canada
First language	2016		2011		2006		
First language	Pop.	%	Pop.	%	Pop.	%	Notes
Single language responses	33,947,610	97.64%	32,481,635	98.07%	30,848,270	98.74%	
Official languages	26,627,545	76.59%	25,913,955	78.24%	24,700,425	79.06%	
English	19,460,855	55.97%	18,858,980	56.94%	17,882,775	57.24%	
French	7,166,700	20.61%	7,054,975	21.3%	6,817,650	21.82%	
Non-official languages	7,321,070	21.06%	6,567,680	19.83%	6,147,840	19.68%	
Combined Chinese Responses	1,227,680	3.53%	n/a	n/a	n/a	n/a	Combined responses of Mandarin, Cantonese, Chinese n.o.s. and Min Nan
Mandarin (Standard Chinese)	592,035	1.7%	248,705	0.75%	170,950	0.55%	
Cantonese	565,275	1.63%	372,460	1.12%	361,450	1.16%	
Punjabi	501,680	1.44%	430,705	1.3%	367,505	1.18%	
Spanish	458,850	1.32%	410,670	1.24%	345,345	1.11%	
Tagalog (Filipino)	431,385	1.24%	327,445	0.99%	235,615	0.75%	
Arabic	419,895	1.21%	327,870	0.99%	261,640	0.84%	
German	384,040	1.1%	409,200	1.24%	450,570	1.44%	
Italian	375,645	1.08%	407,485	1.23%	455,040	1.46%	
Hindustani	321,465	0.92%	263,345	0.8%	224,045	0.72%	Combined responses of Hindi and Urdu
Portuguese	221,535	0.64%	211,335	0.64%	219,275	0.7%	
Persian (Farsi)	214,200	0.62%	170,045	0.51%	134,080	0.43%	
Urdu	210,820	0.61%	172,800	0.52%	145,805	0.47%	
Dravidian languages	189,405	0.54%	n/a	n/a	n/a	n/a	Combined responses of Tamil, Malayalam, Telugu and Kannada.
Russian	188,255	0.54%	164,330	0.5%	133,580	0.43%	
Polish	181,705	0.52%	191,645	0.58%	211,175	0.68%	
Vietnamese	156,430	0.45%	144,880	0.44%	141,625	0.45%	
Korean	153,425	0.44%	137,925	0.42%	125,570	0.4%	
Tamil	140,720	0.4%	131,265	0.4%	115,880	0.37%	Most of the Canadian Tamils live in Toronto.
Hindi	110,645	0.32%	90,545	0.27%	78,240	0.25%	
Gujarati	108,775	0.31%	91,450	0.28%	81,465	0.26%	
Greek	106,520	0.31%	108,925	0.33%	117,285	0.38%	
Ukrainian	102,485	0.29%	111,540	0.34%	134,500	0.43%	
Dutch	99,015	0.28%	110,490	0.33%	128,900	0.41%	
Romanian	96,660	0.28%	90,300	0.27%	78,495	0.25%	
Bengali	73,125	0.21%	59,370	0.18%	45,685	0.15%	
Creoles	72,130	0.21%	61,725	0.19%	53,515	0.17%	
Cree, n.o.s. (Note: n.o.s. – not otherwise specified)	64,045	0.18%	77,900	0.24%	78,855	0.25%	In the 2006 Census, this language was referred to simply as 'Cree'.
Hungarian	61,235	0.18%	67,920	0.21%	73,335	0.23%	The majority of Hungarian speakers in Canada live in Ontario. A community of Hungarian speakers is found within a part of Windsor, Ontario.
Berber languages (Kabyle)	n/a	n/a	57,855	0.17%	25,578	0.08%	
Serbian	57,345	0.16%	56,420	0.17%	51,665	0.17%	
Croatian	48,200	0.14%	49,730	0.15%	55,330	0.18%	
Japanese	43,640	0.13%	39,985	0.12%	40,200	0.13%	
Chinese, n.o.s.	38,575	0.11%	425,210	1.28%	456,705	1.46%	
Somali	36,760	0.11%	31,380	0.09%	27,320	0.09%	
Inuktitut	35,215	0.1%	33,500	0.1%	32,015	0.1%	In the 2006 Census, this language was referred to as 'Inuktitut, n.i.e.'. (Note: n.i.e. – not included elsewhere)
Armenian	33,455	0.1%	29,795	0.09%	30,130	0.1%	
Turkish	32,815	0.09%	29,640	0.09%	24,745	0.08%	
Min Nan (Chaochow, Teochow, Fukien, Taiwanese)	31,795	0.09%	n/a	n/a	n/a	n/a	
Malayalam	28,570	0.08%	16,080	0.05%	11,925	0.04%	
Albanian	26,895	0.08%	23,820	0.07%	n/a	n/a	
Ilocano	26,345	0.08%	17,915	0.05%	13,450	0.04%	
Amharic	22,465	0.06%	18,020	0.05%	14,555	0.05%	
Czech	22,295	0.06%	23,585	0.07%	24,450	0.08%	
Khmer (Cambodian)	20,130	0.06%	19,440	0.06%	19,105	0.06%	
Bulgarian	20,020	0.06%	19,050	0.06%	16,790	0.05%	
Hebrew	19,530	0.06%	18,450	0.06%	17,635	0.06%	
Niger–Congo languages, n.i.e.	19,140	0.06%	14,075	0.04%	n/a	n/a	
Nepali	18,275	0.05%	8,480	0.03%	n/a	n/a	
Ojibway	17,885	0.05%	17,625	0.05%	24,190	0.08%	
Slovak	17,585	0.05%	17,580	0.05%	18,820	0.06%	
Pashto	16,910	0.05%	12,465	0.04%	9,025	0.03%	
Macedonian	16,770	0.05%	17,245	0.05%	18,435	0.06%	
Tigrigna	16,650	0.05%	10,220	0.03%	7,105	0.02%	
Sinhala	16,335	0.05%	14,185	0.04%	10,180	0.03%	
Bisayan languages	n/a	n/a	16,240	0.05%	11,240	0.04%	
Telugu	15,655	0.05%	9,315	0.03%	6,625	0.02%	
Finnish	15,295	0.04%	17,415	0.05%	21,030	0.07%	
Yiddish	13,555	0.04%	15,205	0.05%	16,295	0.05%	
Akan (Twi)	13,460	0.04%	12,680	0.04%	12,780	0.04%	
Swahili	13,375	0.04%	10,090	0.03%	7,935	0.03%	
Wu (Shanghainese)	12,920	0.04%	n/a	n/a	n/a	n/a	
Oji-Cree	12,855	0.04%	9,835	0.03%	11,690	0.04%	
Lao	12,670	0.04%	12,970	0.04%	13,940	0.04%	
Danish	12,630	0.04%	14,145	0.04%	18,735	0.06%	
Malay	12,275	0.04%	10,910	0.03%	9,490	0.03%	
Bosnian	12,210	0.04%	11,685	0.04%	12,790	0.04%	
Sindhi	11,860	0.03%	11,330	0.03%	10,355	0.03%	
Kurdish	11,705	0.03%	9,805	0.03%	7,660	0.02%	
Hakka	10,910	0.03%	5,115	0.02%	n/a	n/a	
Dene	10,700	0.03%	11,215	0.03%	9,745	0.03%	
Afrikaans	10,260	0.03%	8,770	0.03%	n/a	n/a	
Montagnais (Innu)	10,230	0.03%	10,785	0.03%	10,975	0.04%	In the 2006 Census, this language was referred to as 'Montagnais-Naskapi'.
Slovenian	9,785	0.03%	10,775	0.03%	13,135	0.04%	
Taiwanese	n/a	n/a	9,635	0.03%	9,620	0.03%	
Serbo-Croatian	9,555	0.03%	10,155	0.03%	12,510	0.04%	
African languages, n.i.e.	n/a	n/a	9,125	0.03%	n/a	n/a	
Thai	9,255	0.03%	7,935	0.02%	n/a	n/a	
Marathi	8,295	0.02%	5,830	0.02%	n/a	n/a	
Bantu languages, n.i.e.	n/a	n/a	7,150	0.02%	n/a	n/a	
Lithuanian	7,075	0.02%	7,245	0.02%	8,335	0.03%	
Swedish	6,840	0.02%	7,350	0.02%	8,220	0.03%	
Mi'kmaq	6,690	0.02%	7,635	0.02%	7,365	0.02%	
Tibetan	6,165	0.02%	n/a	n/a	n/a	n/a	
Atikamekw	6,150	0.02%	5,820	0.02%	5,250	0.02%	
Canadian Gaelic	n/a	n/a	6,015	0.02%	6,015	0.02%	
Fukien (Fuzhou dialect)	n/a	n/a	5,925	0.02%	n/a	n/a	
Rundi (Kirundi)	5,845	0.02%	3,975	0.01%	n/a	n/a	
Maltese	5,565	0.02%	6,220	0.02%	6,405	0.02%	
Estonian	5,445	0.02%	6,385	0.02%	8,240	0.03%	
Latvian	5,455	0.02%	6,200	0.02%	7,000	0.02%	
Kinyarwanda (Rwanda)	5,250	0.02%	3,895	0.01%	n/a	n/a	
Indo-Iranian languages, n.i.e.	5,180	0.01%	5,255	0.02%	n/a	n/a	
Oromo	4,960	0.01%	11,140	0.03%	n/a	n/a	
Norwegian	4,615	0.01%	5,800	0.02%	7,225	0.02%	
Tibetan languages	n/a	n/a	4,640	0.01%	n/a	n/a	
Sino-Tibetan languages, n.i.e.	n/a	n/a	4,360	0.01%	n/a	n/a	
Sign languages, n.i.e.	4,125	0.01%	3,815	0.01%	n/a	n/a	
Vlaams (Flemish)	3,895	0.01%	4,690	0.01%	5,660	0.02%	
Lingala	3,810	0.01%	3,085	0.01%	n/a	n/a	
Burmese	3,585	0.01%	2,985	0.01%	n/a	n/a	
Stoney	3,025	0.01%	3,050	0.01%	n/a	n/a	
Shanghainese	n/a	n/a	2,920	0.01%	n/a	n/a	
Blackfoot	2,815	<0.01%	n/a	n/a	3,085	0.01%	
Slavic languages, n.i.e.	2,420	0.01%	3,630	0.01%	n/a	n/a	
Semitic languages, n.i.e.	2,155	0.01%	16,970	0.05%	n/a	n/a	
Frisian	2,095	<0.01%	n/a	n/a	2,890	0.01%	
Dogrib (Tlicho)	1,645	<0.01%	n/a	n/a	2,020	0.01%	
Tibeto-Burman languages, n.i.e.	1,405	<0.01%	n/a	n/a	n/a	n/a	
Siouan languages (Dakota/Sioux)	1,265	<0.01%	n/a	n/a	5,585	0.02%	
Algonquin	1,260	<0.01%	n/a	n/a	1,920	0.01%	
Scottish Gaelic	1,095	<0.01%	n/a	n/a	n/a	n/a	
Welsh	1,075	<0.01%	n/a	n/a	n/a	n/a	
Carrier	1,030	<0.01%	n/a	n/a	1,560	<0.01%	
Inuinnaqtun (Inuvialuktun)	1,020	<0.01%	n/a	n/a	365	<0.01%	
Mohawk	985	<0.01%	n/a	n/a	290	<0.01%	
South Slavey	950	<0.01%	n/a	n/a	1,605	0.01%	
Gitxsan (Gitksan)	880	<0.01%	n/a	n/a	1,180	<0.01%	
North Slave (Hare)	765	<0.01%	n/a	n/a	1,065	<0.01%	
Chilcotin	655	<0.01%	n/a	n/a	1,070	<0.01%	
Celtic languages, n.i.e.	530	<0.01%	n/a	n/a	n/a	n/a	
Chipewyan	n/a	n/a	n/a	n/a	525	<0.01%	
Michif	465	<0.01%	n/a	n/a	n/a	n/a	
Shuswap (Secwepemctsin)	445	<0.01%	n/a	n/a	935	<0.01%	
Nisga'a	400	<0.01%	n/a	n/a	680	<0.01%	
Malecite	300	<0.01%	n/a	n/a	535	<0.01%	
Kutchin-Gwich’in (Loucheux)	260	<0.01%	n/a	n/a	360	<0.01%	
Tlingit	95	<0.01%	n/a	n/a	80	<0.01%	
Other languages	n/a	n/a	77,890	0.2%	172,650	0.55%	
Multiple language responses	818,640	2.35%	639,540	1.9%	392,760	1.26%	
English and French	165,335	0.48%	144,685	0.4%	98,630	0.32%	
English and a non-official language	533,260	1.53%	396,330	1.2%	240,005	0.77%	
French and a non-official language	86,145	0.25%	74,430	0.2%	43,335	0.14%	
English, French, and a non-official language	33,900	0.1%	24,095	0.07%	10,790	0.03%	
Total	34,767,250	100%	33,121,175	100%	31,241,030	100%	

=== Work ===
Language used most often at work
Language	% of total population (2016)	% of total population (2006)
English	76.49%	76.36%
French	19.17%	20.22%
Non-official	1.38%	1.49%
English and French	2.07%	1.37%
English and non-official	0.77%	0.47%
Other (Note: French and non-official language OR English, French and non-official language)	0.12%	0.09%

=== Home ===
Language used most often at home
Language	% of total population (2016)	% of total population (2006)
English	63.75%	65.89%
French	19.97%	21.15%
Non-official	11.5%	11.11%
English and non-official	3.7%	1.3%
English and French	0.46%	0.3%
Other (Note: French and non-official language OR English, French and non-official language)	0.63%	0.24%

== Immigration ==
According to the 2021 Canadian census, immigrants in Canada number 8.3 million persons and make up approximately 23 percent of Canada's total population. This represents the eighth-largest immigrant population in the world, while the proportion represents one of the highest ratios for industrialized Western countries.

Immigrants from specific countries are divided into several ethnic groups. For example, there are both Punjabis and Muhajirs from Pakistan, both Turks and Kurds from Turkey and both Sinhalese and Tamil from Sri Lanka. Immigrants from Iran are divided into Mazandaranians, Armenians, Azeris, Persians, Kurds, Gilaks and Lurs.

Since confederation in 1867 through to the contemporary era, decadal and demi-decadal census reports have detailed immigration statistics. During this period, the highest annual immigration rate in Canada occurred in 1913, when 400,900 new immigrants accounted for 5.3 percent of the total population, while the greatest number of foreign-born individuals admitted to Canada in single year occurred in 2021, with 405,330 new immigrants accounting for 1.1 percent of the total population.

Statistics Canada projects that immigrants will represent between 29.1% and 34.0% of Canada's population in 2041, compared with 23.0% in 2021, while the Canadian population with at least one foreign born parent (first and second generation persons) could rise to between 49.8% and 54.3%, up from 44.0% in 2021.

Canada Immigration Statistics
Year	Immigrant percentage	Immigrant population	Total responses	Total population	Source(s)
1851 (Note: Total responses cover Province of Canada (including Upper Canada & Lower Canada) & New Brunswick territory, where censuses enumerated place of birth. Total population includes Nova Scotia where a census did take place in 1851, however only enumerated population and not place of birth.)	26.3%	535,153	2,036,065	2,312,919	
1861 (Note: British North American territory (Upper Canada, Lower Canada, New Brunswick, and Nova Scotia) that comprised Canada following Canadian Confederation in 1867.)	21.9%	677,967	3,090,561	3,090,561	
1871 (Note: The figures for 1871 cover the four original provinces of Canada (Quebec, Ontario, Nova Scotia, and New Brunswick) only.)	17%	593,403	3,485,761	3,485,761	
1881	13.9%	602,984	4,324,810	4,324,810	
1891	13.3%	643,871	4,833,239	4,833,239	
1901	13%	699,500	5,371,315	5,371,315	
1911	22%	1,586,961	7,206,643	7,206,643	
1921	22.3%	1,955,736	8,787,949	8,787,949	
1931	22.2%	2,307,525	10,374,196	10,374,196	
1941	17.5%	2,018,847	11,506,655	11,506,655	
1951	14.7%	2,059,911	14,009,429	14,009,429	
1961	15.6%	2,844,263	18,238,247	18,238,247	
1971	15.3%	3,295,535	21,568,310	21,568,311	
1981	16%	3,843,335	24,083,495	24,343,181	
1986	15.6%	3,908,150	25,022,005	25,309,331	
1991	16.1%	4,342,890	26,994,045	27,296,859	
1996	17.4%	4,971,070	28,528,125	28,846,761	
2001	18.4%	5,448,480	29,639,030	30,007,094	
2006	19.8%	6,186,950	31,241,030	31,612,897	
2011	20.6%	6,775,765	32,852,325	33,476,688	
2016	21.9%	7,540,830	34,460,060	35,151,728	
2021	23%	8,361,505	36,328,475	36,991,981	

=== Migration data ===
Canada Net migration, 1952–1971
Year	Immigration	Emigration	Net Migration
1952	164,498	60,559	106,939
1953	168,868	57,975	110,893
1954	154,227	57,150	97,077
1955	109,946	61,893	48,053
1956	164,857	68,753	96,104
1957	282,164	74,383	207,781
1958	124,851	61,681	63,170
1959	106,928	69,189	37,739
1960	104,111	75,596	28,515
1961	71,689	72,305	−616
1962	74,586	76,740	−2,154
1963	93,151	83,563	9,588
1964	112,606	92,430	20,176
1965	146,758	105,307	41,451
1966	194,743	91,489	103,254
1967	222,876	108,462	114,414
1968	183,974	100,036	83,938
1969	161,531	90,089	71,495
1970	147,713	80,961	66,752
1971	121,162	70,097	51,065

Canada Net migration, 1972–2019
Year	Immigration	Emigration	Net migration	Net non-permanent migration	Total net migration
1972	122,006	26,175	95,831	2,975	98,806
1973	184,200	40,714	143,486	7,928	151,414
1974	218,465	42,020	176,445	1,977	178,422
1975	187,881	34,280	153,601	7,931	161,532
1976	146,429	28,292	118,137	−2,969	115,168
1977	117,914	29,106	88,808	−1,982	86,826
1978	86,313	31,692	54,621	−2,970	51,651
1979	112,036	24,492	87,544	7,930	95,474
1980	143,498	17,623	125,875	14,869	140,744
1981	128,794	24,604	104,190	30,281	134,471
1982	121,331	31,054	90,277	−3,727	86,550
1983	89,377	31,803	57,574	4,369	61,943
1984	88,599	29,064	59,535	−349	59,186
1985	84,339	26,864	57,474	10,981	68,455
1986	97,343	30,232	67,111	46,537	113,648
1987	152,031	28,865	123,166	40,899	164,065
1988	161,534	24,534	137,000	108,917	245,917
1989	191,516	26,706	164,810	67,356	232,166
1990	216,424	25,011	191,413	−10,951	180,462
1991	232,776	43,396	189,380	−54,661	134,719
1992	254,856	48,721	206,135	−31,933	174,202
1993	256,754	50,657	206,097	−63,292	142,805
1994	224,395	55,682	168,713	−16,500	152,213
1995	212,875	51,252	151,623	169	151,792
1996	226,061	49,841	176,220	−9,667	166,553
1997	216,034	62,803	153,231	791	154,022
1998	174,184	57,842	116,342	921	117,263
1999	189,971	54,387	135,584	22,431	158,015
2000	227,429	57,109	170,330	28,433	198,763
2001	250,638	59,391	191,247	47,286	238,533
2002	229,049	45,682	183,367	29,133	212,500
2003	221,349	49,876	171,473	22,943	194,416
2004	235,859	55,085	180,774	14,225	194,999
2005	262,246	52,436	209,810	3,159	212,969
2006	251,649	47,890	203,759	12,741	216,500
2007	236,763	51,455	185,308	43,958	229,266
2008	247,262	52,678	194,584	71,669	266,253
2009	252,218	41,131	211,087	55,977	267,064
2010	280,739	42,187	238,552	31,927	270,479
2011	248,735	50,932	197,803	42,802	240,605
2012	257,825	50,426	207,399	46,207	253,606
2013	259,046	26,608	232,438	52,984	285,422
2014	260,308	54,956	205,352	16,970	222,322
2015	271,867	56,566	215,301	−9,330	205,971
2016	296,385	56,772	239,613	88,722	328,335
2017	286,537	43,832	242,705	138,034	380,739
2018	321,054	37,915	283,139	154,917	438,056
2019	341,174	35,791	305,383	189,781	495,164

Canada Net migration 2020–present
Year	Immigration	Emigration	Net Migration	Non-permanent Resident Inflow	Non-permanent Resident Outflow	Net Non-permanent Resident	Total Net Migration
2020	184,594	19,235	165,359	–	–	−96,066	69,293
2021	406,046	39,161	366,885	–	–	77,052	443,937
2022	437,612	47,991	389,621	960,266	408,722	551,544	941,165
2023	471,871	48,709	423,162	1,289,173	468,407	820,766	1,243,928
2024	483,591	50,170	433,421	1,036,471	745,306	291,165	724,586
2025	393,752	65,706	328,046	496,278	957,966	−461,688	−133,642

== Religion ==
Religion in Canada (2021 Census)
1. Christianity (53.3%)
2. No religion (34.6%)
3. Islam (4.90%)
4. Hinduism (2.30%)
5. Sikhism (2.10%)
6. Buddhism (1.00%)
7. Judaism (0.90%)
8. Others (0.80%)

In 2021, 53.3% of Canadians were Christians, down from 67.3% in 2011. 29.9% were Catholic while 11.4% were Protestant (all other listed denominations excluding Christian Orthodox, Latter Day Saints and Jehovah's Witnesses). 7.6% were Christian not otherwise specified, 2.1% were "other Christian and Christian-related traditions", 1.7% were Christian Orthodox, 0.4% were Jehovah's Witnesses and 0.2% were Latter Day Saints adherents.

34.6% of Canadians were non-religious or secular, up from 23.9% in 2011. Of the non-Christian religions listed, 4.9% of Canadians were Muslim (3.2% in 2011), 2.3% were Hindu (1.5% in 2011), 2.1% were Sikh (1.4% in 2011), 1.0% were Buddhist (1.1% in 2011), 0.9% were Jewish (1.0% in 2011), 0.2% were believers of traditional (North American Indigenous) spirituality (same as 2011), and 0.6% were believers of other religions and spiritual traditions (0.4% in 2011).

Religion status of the Canadian Population in 2021
Religion	Total	Percent
Christian	19,373,325	53.3%
Roman Catholic	10,880,360	29.9%
Christian n.o.s.	2,760,760	7.6%
United Church	1,214,185	3.3%
Anglican	1,134,315	3.1%
Christian Orthodox	623,010	1.7%
Baptist	436,940	1.2%
Pentecostal and other Charismatic	399,025	1.1%
Lutheran	328,045	0.9%
Presbyterian	301,400	0.8%
Anabaptist	144,145	0.4%
Jehovah's Witness	137,255	0.4%
Methodist and Wesleyan (Holiness)	100,655	0.3%
Latter Day Saints	87,725	0.2%
Reformed	79,870	0.2%
Other Christian and Christian-related traditions	745,650	2.1%
Muslim	1,775,715	4.9%
Hindu	828,195	2.3%
Sikh	771,790	2.1%
Buddhist	356,975	1.0%
Jewish	335,295	0.9%
Traditional (North American Indigenous) Spirituality	80,685	0.2%
Other religions and spiritual traditions	229,015	0.6%
No religion and secular perspectives	12,577,475	34.6%

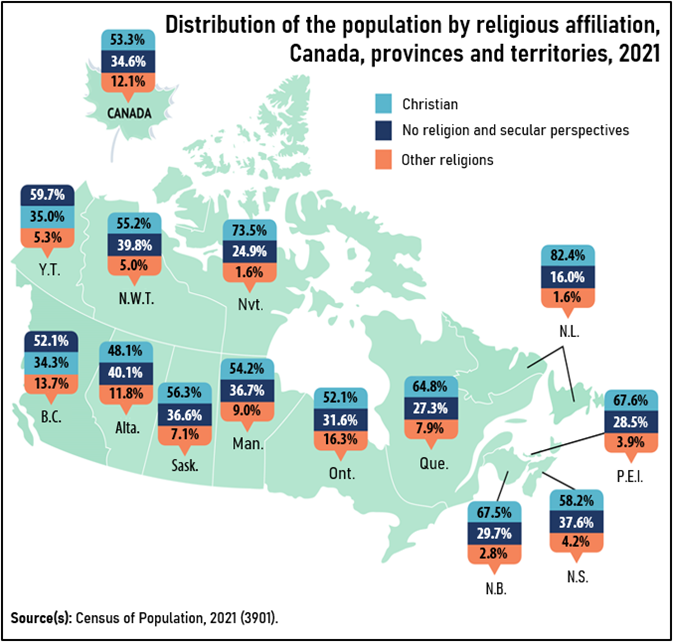
A map of Canada by province and territory showing the distribution of the population by religious affiliation in 2021

== See also ==
- Demographics of North America
- 1666 census of New France
- 2016 Canadian census
- 2021 Canadian census
- List of Canadian census areas demographic extremes
- Interprovincial migration in Canada
- Canada immigration statistics
- Cahiers québécois de démographie academic journal
- Canadian Studies in Population academic journal
