= Canadian Studies in Population =

- Discipline: Demography
- Language: English, French
- Edited by: Lisa Strohschein

Publication details
- History: 1974-present
- Publisher: Springer Nature (Canada)
- Frequency: Quarterly
- Open access: hybrid
- Impact factor: 0.773 (2020)

Standard abbreviations
- ISO 4: Can. Stud. Popul.

Indexing
- ISSN: 0380-1489 (print); 1927-629X (web)
- LCCN: 86642598
- OCLC no.: 85449592

Links
- Journal homepage

Canadian Studies in Population is a peer-reviewed academic journal publishing original research in areas of demography, population studies, demographic analysis, and the demographics of Canada and other populations. The journal was established in 1974 and was published as an open-access journal by the Population Laboratory Department of Sociology at the University of Alberta until 2018, when it was taken over by Springer Nature.

Articles are published in English, with abstracts in French and English. Canadian Studies in Population is indexed in Web of Science, Current Contents/Social and Behavioral Sciences, Social Sciences Citation Index, and Sociological Abstracts.

== Scope ==
The Canadian Studies in Population publishes articles on a broad range of studies in substantive and technical demography and related fields of study. While Canadian Studies in Population emphasizes the demography of Canada, the editorial board encourages manuscript submissions from all sectors of the international community. The journal occasionally publishes special volumes of interdisciplinary research.

== History ==
Since its founding in 1974, Canadian Studies in Population has been the official journal of the Canadian Population Society (CPS) and the leading journal on population studies in Canada, promoting dialogue between Canadian researchers, statistical agencies and policymakers.

== See also ==
- Open access in Canada
