= List of Canadian census areas demographic extremes =

This is a list of census areas of demographic notability in Canada. Data is from the Canada 2021 Census.

== All census subdivisions ==
- Most populous municipality: Toronto, Ontario, 2,794,356
- Highest percentage increase in population from 2016: Kapawe'no First Nation 229, Alberta, 1,840.0%
  - This geographic area underwent a boundary change since the 2016 Census that resulted in an adjustment to the 2016 population and/or dwelling counts for this area. The second highest percentage increase was in The Narrows 49, Manitoba, 1,000.0%.
- Largest census subdivision by land area: Qikiqtaaluk, Nunavut, 968,988.38 km^{2}
- Highest % of the population under 15: Rolling River 67B, Manitoba, 54.5%
- Highest % of the population 15-64: Stryen 9, Lytton First Nation, British Columbia, 100.0%
- Lowest % of the population 15-64: Notre-Dame-des-Anges, Quebec, 2.1%
- Highest % of the population 65+: Notre-Dame-des-Anges, Quebec, 97.9%
- Highest % of the population 85+: Notre-Dame-des-Anges, Quebec, 60.4%
- Highest median age: Notre-Dame-des-Anges, Quebec, 87
- Lowest median age: Halfway River 168, British Columbia, 14.5

== Census subdivisions over 5,000 people ==
- Highest % increase in population from 2016: East Gwillimbury, Ontario, 44.4%
- Highest % decrease in population from 2016: Athabasca County, Alberta, -11.6%
- Largest census subdivision by land area: Kenora, Unorganized, Ontario, 388,982.20 km^{2}
- Smallest municipality by land area: Montreal West, Quebec, 1.37 km^{2}
- Highest population density: Vancouver, British Columbia, 5,749.9/km^{2}
- Lowest population density: Kenora, Unorganized, Ontario, 0.019/km^{2}
- Highest % of the population under 15: Mackenzie County, Alberta, 36.3%
- Lowest % of the population under 15: Qualicum Beach, British Columbia, 6.8%
- Highest % of the population 15-64: Whistler, British Columbia, 79.8%
- Lowest % of the population 15-64: Qualicum Beach, British Columbia, 36.9%
- Highest % of the population 65+: Qualicum Beach, British Columbia, 56.3%
- Lowest % of the population 65+: Iqaluit, Nunavut, 3.7%
- Highest % of the population 85+: Sidney, British Columbia, 9.3%
- Lowest % of the population 85+: Iqaluit, Nunavut, 0.1%
- Highest median age: Qualicum Beach, British Columbia: 67.5
- Lowest median age: Mackenzie County, Alberta, 23.4
- Highest % of people whose mother tongue is English: Bay Roberts, Newfoundland and Labrador, 99.2%
- Lowest % of people whose mother tongue is English: Amqui, Quebec, 0.2%
- Highest % of people whose mother tongue is French: Amqui, Quebec: 99.3%
- Lowest % of people whose mother tongue is French: Mackenzie County, Alberta; Taber, Alberta; and Norway House, Manitoba, 0.1%
- Highest % of people whose mother tongue is a Non-official language: Mackenzie County, Alberta, 64.1%
- Lowest % of people whose mother tongue is a Non-official language: Saint-Honoré, Quebec and Amqui, Quebec, 0.2%
- Highest % immigrants: Richmond, British Columbia, 60.3%
- Lowest % immigrants: Bay Roberts, Newfoundland and Labrador, 0.34%
- Highest % of population with no high school degree: Mackenzie County, Alberta, 54.2%
- Lowest % of population with no high school degree: Whistler, British Columbia, 4.5%
- Highest % with university degree: Westmount, Quebec, 63.3%
- Lowest % of population with university degree: Saint-Lin–Laurentides, Quebec, 5.0%

=== Visible minorities and Aboriginal population ===
- Highest % Arab: Laval, Quebec, 11.42%
- Highest % Black: Brooks, Alberta, 22.29%
- Highest % Chinese: Richmond, British Columbia, 54.25%
- Highest % Filipino: Neepawa, Manitoba, 46.85%
- Highest % First Nations: Norway House, Manitoba, 95.50%
- Highest % Indigenous: Norway House, Manitoba, 98.59%
- Highest % Inuit: Iqaluit, Nunavut, 52.39%
- Highest % Japanese: Banff, Alberta, 6.20%
- Highest % Korean: Coquitlam, British Columbia, 8.07%
- Highest % Latin American: Leamington, Ontario, 7.42%
- Highest % Métis: Meadow Lake, Saskatchewan, 23.15%
- Highest % South Asian: Brampton, Ontario, 52.42%
- Highest % Southeast Asian: Chestermere, Alberta, 5.03%
- Highest % West Asian: Richmond Hill, Ontario, 13.15%
- Highest % visible minority: Markham, Ontario, 82.10%
- Lowest % visible minority: Norway House, Manitoba, 0.19%

== Census metropolitan areas ==
=== Population and area ===
- Most populous: Toronto, Ontario, 6,202,225
- Least populous: Red Deer, Alberta, 100,844
- Highest increase in population (%) from 2016: Kelowna, British Columbia, 14.0%
- Lowest increase in population (%), from 2016: Saguenay, Quebec, 0.03%
- Largest land area (km^{2}): Edmonton, Alberta, 9,416.19
- Smallest land area (km^{2}): Red Deer, Alberta, 104.34
- Highest population density (per km^{2}): Toronto, Ontario, 1,050.7
- Lowest population density (per km^{2}): Fredericton, New Brunswick, 18.1

=== Age and sex ===
- Highest proportion (%) of men: Drummondville, Quebec, 50.04%
- Highest proportion (%) of women: Peterborough, Ontario, 51.89%
- Highest median age: Trois-Rivières, Quebec, 46.4
- Lowest median age: Saskatoon, Saskatchewan, 36.8
- Highest percentage of children (0–14 years): Saskatoon, Saskatchewan, 19.11%
- Highest percentage of working-age population (15–64 years): Vancouver, British Columbia, 68.49%
- Highest percentage of seniors (65 years and over): Trois-Rivières, Quebec, 25.66%
- Highest percentage of seniors (85 years and over): Peterborough, Ontario, 3.4%

=== Education ===
- Highest % of university degree at bachelor's level or above: Toronto, Ontario, 38.0%
- Lowest % of university degree at bachelor's level or above: Drummondville, Quebec, 12.8%

=== Income ===
- Highest median employment income: Ottawa-Gatineau: $46,400
- Lowest median employment income: St. Catharines-Niagara, Ontario, $29,400
- Median employment income:
  - Less than high school education:
    - Highest: Lethbridge, Alberta, $23,000
    - Lowest: Kingston, Ontario, $9,000
  - High school education:
    - Highest: Chilliwack, British Columbia, $32,400
    - Lowest: Saguenay, Quebec, $20,200
  - Postsecondary certificate or diploma below bachelor level:
    - Highest: Edmonton, Alberta, $51,200
    - Lowest: St. Catharines-Niagara, Ontario, $36,000
  - Bachelor's degree or higher:
    - Highest: Ottawa-Gatineau, $70,000
    - Lowest: St. Catharines-Niagara, Ontario, $46,800
  - Canadian-born, with less than high school education:
    - Highest: Edmonton, Alberta, $22,200
    - Lowest: Windsor, Ontario, $8,300
  - Canadian-born, with high school education:
    - Highest: Regina, Saskatchewan, $34,000
    - Lowest: Toronto, Ontario, $20,200
  - Canadian-born, with university degree:
    - Highest: Ottawa-Gatineau, $76,000
    - Lowest: St. Catharines-Niagara, Ontario, $54,000
  - Immigrant population, with less than high school education:
    - Highest: Lethbridge, Alberta, $34,400
    - Lowest: Fredericton, New Brunswick, $5,480
  - Immigrant population, with high school education:
    - Highest: Red Deer, Alberta; and Abbotsford-Mission, British Columbia, $33,200
    - Lowest: Trois-Rivières, Quebec, $15,600
  - Immigrant population, with university degree:
    - Highest: Ottawa-Gatineau, $62,400
    - Lowest: St. Catharines-Niagara, Ontario, $37,600

=== Visible minorities and Indigenous population ===
==== Highest population ====
- Not-a-visible-minority: Montreal, Quebec, 2,597,870
- Visible minorities: Toronto, Ontario, 3,501,270
- Arab: Montreal, Quebec, 246,150
- Black: Toronto, Ontario, 488,155
- Chinese: Toronto, Ontario, 679,730
- Filipino: Toronto, Ontario, 281,150
- First Nations: Montreal, Quebec, 89,375
- Indigenous: Montreal, Quebec, 112,350
- Inuit: Ottawa-Gatineau, 2,235
- Japanese: Vancouver, British Columbia, 31,200
- Korean: Toronto, Ontario, 74,210
- Latin American: Toronto, Ontario, 156,460
- Métis: Winnipeg, Manitoba, 52,370
- South Asian: Toronto, Ontario, 1,182,485
- Southeast Asian: Toronto, Ontario, 102,330
- West Asian: Toronto, Ontario, 160,335

==== Highest percentage ====
- Not-a-visible-minority: Saguenay, Quebec, 98.1%
- Visible minorities: Toronto, Ontario, 57.0%
- Arab: Windsor, Ontario, 6.2%
- Black: Montreal, Quebec, 8.1%
- Chinese: Vancouver, British Columbia, 19.7%
- Filipino: Winnipeg, Manitoba, 10.3%
- First Nations: Thunder Bay, Ontario, 10.1%
- Indigenous: Thunder Bay, Ontario, 14.6%
- Inuit: St. John's, Newfoundland and Labrador, 0.8%
- Japanese: Lethbridge, Alberta, 1.4%
- Korean: Vancouver, British Columbia, 2.4%
- Latin American: Montreal, Quebec, 3.3%
- Métis: Winnipeg, Manitoba, 6.4%
- South Asian: Abbotsford-Mission, British Columbia, 25.9%
- Southeast Asian: Vancouver, British Columbia, 2.2%
- West Asian: Toronto, Ontario, 2.6%

=== Language ===
Mother tongue

- Highest population with English as mother tongue: Toronto, Ontario, 3,070,355
- Highest population with French as mother tongue: Montreal, Quebec, 2,515,095
- Highest population with both English and French as mother tongues: Montreal, Quebec, 79,655
- Highest population with a non-official language as mother tongue: Toronto, Ontario, 2,597,980
- Highest population with an Indigenous language as mother tongue: Winnipeg, Manitoba, 2,735
- Lowest population with English as mother tongue: Drummondville, Quebec, 1,020
- Lowest population with French as mother tongue: Lethbridge, Alberta, 865
- Lowest population with both English and French as mother tongues: Lethbridge, Alberta, 225
- Lowest population with a non-official language as mother tongue: Saguenay, Quebec, 1,650
- Lowest population with an Indigenous language as mother tongue: Drummondville, Quebec; and Guelph, Ontario, 0
- Highest percentage with English as mother tongue: St. John's, Newfoundland and Labrador, 94.5%
- Highest percentage with French as mother tongue: Saguenay, Quebec, 97.5%
- Highest percentage with both English and French as mother tongues: Greater Sudbury, Ontario, 3.4%
- Highest percentage with a non-official language as mother tongue: Vancouver, British Columbia, 42.6%
- Highest percentage with an Indigenous language as mother tongue: Thunder Bay, Ontario, 0.8%
- Lowest percentage with English as mother tongue: Saguenay, Quebec, 0.8%
- Lowest percentage with French as mother tongue: St. John's, Newfoundland and Labrador, 0.5%
- Lowest percentage with both English and French as mother tongues: Lethbridge, Alberta, 0.2%
- Lowest percentage with a non-official language as mother tongue: Saguenay, Quebec, 1.0%

Language most often spoken at home

- Highest population with English most often spoken at home: Toronto, Ontario, 4,035,545
- Highest population with French most often spoken at home: Montreal, Quebec, 2,708,435
- Highest population with a non-official language most often spoken at home: Toronto, Ontario, 1,626,995
- Highest population with English and French spoken equally at home: Montreal, Quebec, 96,355
- Highest population with English and a non-official language spoken equally at home: Toronto, Ontario, 449,840
- Highest population with French and a non-official language spoken equally at home: Montreal, Quebec, 96,360
- Lowest population with English most often spoken at home: Drummondville, Quebec, 845
- Lowest population with French most often spoken at home: Kamloops, British Columbia, 195
- Lowest population with a non-official language most often spoken at home: Saguenay, Quebec, 705
- Lowest population with English and French spoken equally at home: Chilliwack, British Columbia, 100
- Highest percentage with English most often spoken at home: St. John's, Newfoundland and Labrador, 96.9%
- Highest percentage with French most often spoken at home: Saguenay, Quebec, 98.4%
- Highest percentage with a non-official language most often spoken at home: Vancouver, British Columbia, 27.8%
- Highest percentage with English and French spoken equally at home: Montreal, Quebec, 2.3%
- Highest percentage with English and a non-official language spoken equally at home: Toronto, Ontario, 7.3%
- Highest percentage with French and a non-official language spoken equally at home: Montreal, Quebec, 2.3%
- Lowest percentage with English most often spoken at home: Saguenay, Quebec, 0.6%
- Lowest percentage with French most often spoken at home: Abbotsford-Mission, British Columbia, 0.2%
- Lowest percentage with a non-official language most often spoken at home: Saguenay, Quebec, 0.4%
- Lowest population with English and French spoken equally at home: St. John's, Newfoundland and Labrador, 0.1%

Knowledge of official languages

- Highest population with knowledge of English only: Toronto, Ontario, 5,436,685
- Highest population with knowledge of French only: Montreal, Quebec, 1,434,620
- Highest population with knowledge of both English and French: Montreal, Quebec, 2,396,530
- Highest population with knowledge of neither English nor French: Toronto, Ontario, 263,670
- Lowest population with knowledge of English only: Drummondville, Quebec, 295
- Lowest population with knowledge of French only: Kamloops, British Columbia, 20
- Lowest population with knowledge of both English and French: Chilliwack, British Columbia, 4,815
- Lowest population with knowledge of neither English nor French: Saguenay, Quebec, 115
- Highest percentage with knowledge of English only: Chilliwack, British Columbia, 94.9%
- Highest percentage with knowledge of French only: Saguenay, Quebec, 76.0%
- Highest percentage with knowledge of both English and French: Montreal, Quebec, 56.4%
- Highest percentage with knowledge of neither English nor French: Abbotsford-Mission, British Columbia, 5.5%
- Lowest percentage with knowledge of English only: Saguenay, Quebec, 0.2%
- Lowest percentage with knowledge of French only: Chilliwack, British Columbia, 0.03%
- Lowest percentage with knowledge of both English and French: Abbotsford-Mission, British Columbia, 4.3%
- Lowest percentage with knowledge of neither English nor French: Saguenay, Quebec, 0.1%

=== Immigration and citizenship ===
- Highest proportion (%) of Canadian citizens: Saguenay, Quebec, 98.6%
- Lowest proportion (%) of Canadian citizens: Vancouver, British Columbia, 83.6%
- Highest proportion (%) immigrants: Toronto, Ontario, 46.6%
- Highest proportion (%) non-immigrants: Saguenay, Quebec, 97.7%
- Highest proportion (%) immigrants who arrived in Canada before 2001: Toronto, Ontario, 23.7%
- Highest proportion (%) immigrants who arrived between 2001 and 2005: Toronto, Ontario, 5.9%
- Highest proportion (%) immigrants who arrived between 2006 and 2010: Toronto, Ontario, 5.3%
- Highest proportion (%) immigrants who arrived between 2011 and 2015: Calgary, Alberta, 6.0%
- Highest proportion (%) immigrants who arrived after 2016: Toronto, Ontario, 6.4%
- Highest proportion (%) of non-permanent residents: Vancouver, British Columbia, 5.1%
- Lowest proportion (%) immigrants who arrived in Canada before 2001: Saguenay, Quebec, 0.4%
- Lowest proportion (%) immigrants who arrived between 2001 and 2005: Saguenay, Quebec, 0.2%
- Lowest proportion (%) immigrants who arrived between 2006 and 2010: Saguenay, Quebec, 0.2%
- Lowest proportion (%) immigrants who arrived between 2011 and 2015: Saguenay, Quebec, 0.2%
- Lowest proportion (%) immigrants who arrived after 2016: Chilliwack, British Columbia, 0.7%
- Highest proportion (%) of non-permanent residents: Vancouver, British Columbia, 5.1%
- Highest % of India as place of birth of immigrants: Abbotsford-Mission, British Columbia, 51.9%
- Highest % of United Kingdom as place of birth of immigrants: Peterborough, Ontario, 24.3%
- Highest % of United States as place of birth of immigrants: Fredericton, New Brunswick, 9.7%
- Highest % of Italy as place of birth of immigrants: Thunder Bay, Ontario, 17.1%
- Highest % of Philippines as place of birth of immigrants: Red Deer, Alberta, 38.6%
- Highest % of France as place of birth of immigrants: Saguenay, Quebec, 23.7%
- Highest % of China as place of birth of immigrants: Vancouver, British Columbia, 18.8%
- Highest % of Colombia as place of birth of immigrants: Drummondville, Quebec, 14.3%
- Highest % of Finland as place of birth of immigrants: Thunder Bay, Ontario, 6.3%

=== Ethnic origin (single responses) ===
==== Highest population ====
- Canadian: Montreal, Quebec, 705,615
- Chinese: Toronto, Ontario, 556,440
- Dutch: Toronto, Ontario, 17,785
- English: Toronto, Ontario, 105,495
- Filipino: Toronto, Ontario, 217,150
- Finnish: Thunder Bay, Ontario, 3,170
- French: Montreal, Quebec, 487,200
- German: Edmonton, Alberta, 33,445
- Greek: Toronto, Ontario, 52,375
- Haitian: Montreal, Quebec, 113,400
- Irish: Toronto, Ontario, 60,900
- Italian: Toronto, Ontario, 264,895
- Jamaican: Toronto, Ontario, 78,930
- Japanese: Vancouver, British Columbia, 20,890
- Korean: Toronto, Ontario, 66,590
- Latin, Central, and South American, Toronto, Ontario, 148,535
- North American Indigenous, Winnipeg, Manitoba, 42,040
- Polish: Toronto, Ontario, 71,740
- Portuguese: Toronto, Ontario, 110,275
- Russian: Toronto, Ontario, 36,125
- Scottish: Toronto, Ontario, 53,180
- South Asian: Toronto, Ontario, 823,800
- Ukrainian: Toronto, Ontario, 37,865
- Vietnamese: Toronto, Ontario, 56,745

==== Highest percentage ====
- Canadian: Drummondville, Quebec, 44.9%
- Chinese: Vancouver, British Columbia, 23.1%
- Dutch: Chilliwack, British Columbia, 10.4%
- English: St. John's, Newfoundland and Labrador, 22.4%
- Filipino: Winnipeg, Manitoba, 15.4%
- Finnish: Thunder Bay, Ontario, 5.7%
- French: Québec, Quebec, 23.5%
- German: Regina, Saskatchewan, 10.1%
- Greek: Montreal, Quebec, 1.3%
- Haitian: Montreal, Quebec, 3.5%
- Irish: St. John's, Newfoundland and Labrador, 18.1%
- Italian: Thunder Bay, Ontario, 10.4%
- Jamaican: Oshawa, Ontario, 2.4%
- Japanese: Lethbridge, Alberta, 1.4%
- Korean: Vancouver, British Columbia, 3.3%
- Latin, Central, and South American, Lethbridge, Alberta, 3.6%
- North American Indigenous, Thunder Bay, Ontario, 15.3%
- Polish: Brantford, Ontario, 3.4%
- Portuguese: Kitchener-Cambridge-Waterloo, Ontario, 3.8%
- Russian: Kelowna, British Columbia, 1.3%
- Scottish: Fredericton, New Brunswick, 8.4%
- South Asian: Abbotsford-Mission, British Columbia, 30.1%
- Ukrainian: Saskatoon, Saskatchewan, 6.8%
- Vietnamese: Guelph, Ontario, 2.1%

== Federal electoral districts (2013 redistribution) ==
=== Population and area ===
- Most populous: Edmonton—Wetaskiwin (Alberta), 209,431
- Least populous: Labrador (Newfoundland and Labrador), 26,655
- Highest increase in population (%), 2016-2021: Edmonton—Wetaskiwin (Alberta), 31.9%
- Highest decrease in population (%), 2016-2021: Churchill—Keewatinook Aski (Manitoba): -6.5% (Note: Excludes census data for one or more incompletely enumerated reserves or settlements.)
- Largest land area (km^{2}): Nunavut (Nunavut), 1,836,993.78
- Smallest land area (km^{2}): Toronto Centre (Ontario), 5.84
- Highest population density (per km^{2}): Toronto Centre (Ontario), 20,546.5
- Lowest population density (per km^{2}): Northwest Territories (Northwest Territories): < 0.05

=== Age ===
- Highest median age: Laurentides—Labelle (Quebec), 55.2
- Lowest median age: Nunavut (Nunavut), 25.6
- Highest average age: Bonavista—Burin—Trinity, (Newfoundland and Labrador), 49.8
- Lowest average age: Nunavut (Nunavut), 28.3

=== Education (2006) ===
(highest %)

- Earned doctorate: Vancouver Quadra, British Columbia: 3.9%
- Master's degree: Ottawa Centre, Ontario: 12.7%
- Degree in medicine, dentistry, veterinary medicine or optometry: Vancouver Quadra, British Columbia: 2.7%
- University certificate or diploma above bachelor level: Thornhill, Ontario: 5.0%
- Bachelor's degree: Vancouver Quadra, British Columbia: 27.4%
- University certificate or degree: Vancouver Quadra, British Columbia: 55.7%

=== Ethnic origin (2006) ===
(highest % - multiple responses)

- Inuit: Nunavut, Nunavut: 85.4%
- Canadian: Beauce, Quebec: 83.5%
- First Nations (North American Indian): Churchill, Manitoba: 67.9%
- Chinese: Richmond, British Columbia: 55.9%
- English: Bonavista—Gander—Grand Falls—Windsor, Newfoundland and Labrador: 47.2%
- Scottish: Cardigan, Prince Edward Island: 47.0%
- French: Nickel Belt, Ontario: 46.0%
- Italian: Vaughan, Ontario: 45.2%
- German: Medicine Hat, Alberta: 37.5%
- East Indian: Bramalea-Gore-Malton, Ontario: 35.5%
- Irish: Cardigan, Prince Edward Island: 34.1%
- Ukrainian: Yorkton—Melville, Saskatchewan: 29.3%
- Filipino: Winnipeg North, Manitoba: 29.2%
- Portuguese: Davenport, Ontario: 26.4%
- Jewish: Thornhill, Ontario: 24.2%
- Haitian: Bourassa, Quebec: 17.5%
- Polish: Kildonan-St. Paul, Manitoba: 13.1%
- Finnish: Thunder Bay-Superior North, Ontario: 13.1%
- Greek: Laval-Les Îles, Quebec: 12.4%
- Russian: Thornhill, Ontario: 12.2%
- Sri Lankan: Scarborough-Rouge River, Ontario: 11.9%
- Dutch (Netherlands): Abbotsford, British Columbia: 11.2%
- Iranian: Richmond Hill, Ontario: 10.0%

=== Immigration ===
(highest %)

- Non-immigrants: Lac-Saint-Jean (Quebec): 98.7%
- Immigrants: Scarborough North (Ontario): 64.6%

=== Language (2006) ===
==== Mother tongue ====
(highest %)

- English: Avalon (Newfoundland and Labrador): 99.3%
- French: Montmagny—L'Islet—Kamouraska—Rivière-du-Loup (Quebec): 99.0%
- Inuktitut: Nunavut (Nunavut): 66.8%
- Panjabi (Punjabi): Newton—North Delta (British Columbia): 33.4%
- German: Portage—Lisgar (Manitoba): 23.6%
- Cree, not otherwise specified: Churchill (Manitoba): 21.6%
- Portuguese: Davenport (Ontario): 20.7%
- Italian: Vaughan (Ontario): 19.2%
- Cantonese: Richmond (British Columbia): 17.8%
- Tagalog (Pilipino, Filipino): Winnipeg North (Manitoba): 16.8%
- Chinese, not otherwise specified: Richmond (British Columbia): 15.6%
- Arabic: Saint-Laurent—Cartierville (Quebec): 14.0%
- Mandarin: Richmond (British Columbia): 13.4%
- Tamil: Scarborough-Rouge River (Ontario): 13.2%
- Russian: York Centre (Ontario): 11.4%
- Dene: Desnethé-Missinippi-Churchill River (Saskatchewan): 10.5%

===== Language Groups =====
- Aboriginal languages: Nunavut (Nunavut): 68.0%
- Chinese: Richmond (British Columbia): 48.4%
- Indo-Aryan languages: Newton—North Delta (British Columbia): 40.0%
- Romance languages (other than French): Davenport (Ontario): 32.0%
- Germanic languages (other than English): Portage—Lisgar (Manitoba): 24.3%
- Malayo-Polynesian languages: Winnipeg North (Manitoba): 16.8%
- Slavic languages: Etobicoke—Lakeshore (Ontario): 15.0%
- Semitic languages: Saint-Laurent—Cartierville (Quebec): 14.5%
- Dravidian languages: Scarborough-Rouge River (Ontario): 13.5%

==== Home language ====
(highest %)

- English: Avalon (Newfoundland and Labrador): 99.6%
- French: Roberval—Lac-Saint-Jean (Quebec): 99.4%
- Inuktitut: Nunavut (Nunavut): 51.9%
- Panjabi (Punjabi): Newton—North Delta (British Columbia): 26.8%
- Cree, not otherwise specified: Abitibi-Baie-James-Nunavik-Eeyou (Quebec): 16.6%
- Cantonese: Richmond (British Columbia): 15.8%
- Portuguese: Davenport (Ontario): 14.0%
- German: Portage—Lisgar (Manitoba): 12.0%
- Chinese, not otherwise specified: Scarborough-Agincourt (Ontario): 12.0%
- Mandarin: Richmond (British Columbia): 11.8%
- Tamil: Scarborough-Rouge River (Ontario): 10.5%

===== Language groups =====
- Aboriginal languages: Nunavut (Nunavut): 53.0%
- Chinese: Richmond (British Columbia): 39.7%
- Indo-Aryan languages: Newton—North Delta (British Columbia): 30.9%
- Romance languages (other than French): Davenport (Ontario): 21.2%
- Germanic languages (other than English): Portage—Lisgar (Manitoba): 12.2%
- Slavic languages: York Centre (Ontario): 10.9%
- Dravidian languages: Scarborough-Rouge River (Ontario): 10.7%

=== Religion (2006) ===
(highest %)

- Christian: Avalon (Newfoundland and Labrador): 99.0%
- Catholic: Rivière-du-Loup-Montmagny (Quebec): 97.1%
- Protestant: Bonavista—Exploits (Newfoundland and Labrador): 81.0%
- Not a Christian: Vancouver Kingsway (British Columbia): 62.8% (No religious affiliation: 43.5%, Buddhist: 9.9%, Sikh: 3.2%)
- Non-Christian religious affiliation: Mount Royal (Quebec): 49.8% (Jewish: 36.3%, Muslim: 5.6%, Hindu: 4.5%, Buddhist: 3.0%)
- No religious affiliation: Vancouver East (British Columbia): 47.4%
- Non-Judeo-Christian religious affiliation: Newton—North Delta (British Columbia): 38.0% (Sikh: 27.6%, Muslim: 4.3%, Hindu: 4.1%)
- Jewish: Thornhill (Ontario): 36.6%
- Sikh: Newton—North Delta (British Columbia): 27.6%
- Christian Orthodox: Laval—Les Îles (Quebec): 15.9%
- Muslim: Don Valley West (Ontario): 13.6%
- Hindu: Scarborough—Rouge River (Ontario): 13.6%
- Buddhist: Vancouver Kingsway (British Columbia): 9.9%
- Christian, not included elsewhere: Abbotsford (British Columbia): 9.8%

=== Visible minorities ===
(highest %)

- Not a visible minority: Bonavista—Burin—Trinity (Newfoundland and Labrador), 99.2%
- Visible minority: Brampton East (Ontario), 93.4%
- Chinese: Markham—Unionville (Ontario): 66.6%
- South Asian: Brampton East (Ontario), 70.1%
- Filipino: Winnipeg North (Manitoba): 33.1%
- Black: Bourassa (Quebec): 29.4%
- Arab: Saint-Laurent (Quebec): 18.6%
- Latin American: York South-Weston (Ontario): 9.2%
- Korean: Willowdale (Ontario): 9.9%
- West Asian: Richmond Hill (Ontario): 13.9%
- Southeast Asian: Humber River—Black Creek (Ontario): 10.2%
- Japanese: Vancouver Centre (British Columbia): 2.4%

== Indigenous (census subdivisions with 250+ population) (2006) ==
- Highest % Metis: Green Lake, Saskatchewan: 83.3
- Highest % Inuit: Akulivik, Quebec: 98
- Indian reserve with lowest Indigenous %: Duck Lake 7, British Columbia: 3.6
