= Cahiers québécois de démographie =

- Discipline: Demography
- Language: French with abstracts in English and French
- Edited by: Alain Gagnon

Publication details
- Former name: Bulletin de l'Association des démographes du Québec
- History: 1971-present
- Publisher: Association des démographes du Québec (Canada)
- Frequency: Biannually
- Open access: Yes

Standard abbreviations
- ISO 4: Cah. Qué. Démogr.

Indexing
- ISSN: 0380-1721 (print); 1705-1495 (web)
- LCCN: 98641698
- OCLC no.: 2578464

Links
- Journal homepage; Journal archives on Erudit

The Cahiers québécois de démographie (English: Quebec Notebooks of Demography) is a peer-reviewed academic journal publishing original research in areas of demography, demographic analysis, and the demographics of Quebec and other populations.

The journal was established in 1971 and is published biannually by the Association des démographes du Québec (Quebec Association of Demographers), with support from the Demography Department at the Université de Montréal. Articles are published in French, with abstracts in French and English.

The journal is indexed in Revue des revues démographiques, Repère, Sociological Abstracts, and MEDLINE. Articles are freely available online through the Érudit publishing consortium.

== Scope ==
The Cahiers québécois de démographie publishes articles on topics of mortality, fertility, migration, demographic theory, demographic measures, and related issues. Articles may focus on Quebec, Canada, or have an international perspective.

The journal occasionally publishes special volumes of interdisciplinary research on themes such as health, population ageing, urbanization, education, linguistic demography, historical demography, population policy, and the demographics of indigenous peoples, Francophone Africa, or other population groups.

== History ==
The journal was originally entitled Bulletin de l'Association des démographes du Québec (Bulletin of the Quebec Association of Demographers). The name was changed to its current title in 1976.
