= Timeline of women's colleges in the United States =

The following is a timeline of women's colleges in the United States. These are institutions of higher education in the United States whose student population comprises exclusively, or almost exclusively, women. They are often liberal arts colleges. There are approximately 35 active women's colleges in the U.S. as of 2021.

The colleges are listed by the date when they opened to students.

== First and oldest ==
Many of the schools began as either school for girls, academies (which during the late 18th and early 19th centuries was the equivalent of secondary schools), or as a teaching seminary (which during the early 19th century were forms of secular higher education), rather than as a chartered college. During the 19th century in the United States, "Seminaries educated women for the only socially acceptable occupation: teaching. Only unmarried women could be teachers. Many early women's colleges began as female seminaries and were responsible for producing an important corps of educators."

The following is a list of "oldest" and "first" schools, by the date that they opened for students:

- 1742: Bethlehem Female Seminary, (now Moravian University) was the second girls' school, after Ursuline Academy. It became the Moravian Seminary and College for Women in 1807 and later merged with nearby schools to become the coeducational Moravian College in 1952.
- 1772: Salem College, North Carolina was formed as the Little Girls' School by the Moravian Single Sisters and then renamed as the Salem Female Academy. It is the oldest women's educational institution to be in continuous operation.
- 1787: Young Ladies' Academy of Philadelphia was the first government-recognized institution established for women's higher education in the United States.
- 1803: Bradford Academy (later renamed Bradford College) was the first academy in Massachusetts to admit women. The first graduating class had 37 women and 14 men. It closed in 2000.
- 1818: Elizabeth Female Academy was the first female educational institution in Mississippi. It closed in 1843.
- 1821: Clinton Female Seminary was established in Clinton, Georgia. It merged into Georgia Female College (now Wesleyan College in Macon, Georgia) which was granted a charter by the Georgia General Assembly in 1836 that specifically designated the college's purpose as a degree-granting institution of higher learning for the exclusive benefit of female students. It opened in 1839 and awarded the first-known baccalaureate degree to a woman in 1840.
- 1832: The Linden Wood School for Girls (now Lindenwood University) was the first institution of higher education for women west of the Mississippi River. It became coeducational in 1970.
- 1833: Columbia Female Academy (now Stephens College) was originally established as an academy for both high school and college-aged women. It later became a four-year college. It is the second-oldest female educational establishment that is still a women's college.
- 1837: St. Mary's Hall (now Doane Academy) was originally established as a female seminary by George Washington Doane, Bishop of the Episcopal Church of New Jersey. It was the first academic school founded on church principles in the United States. It is now a pre-kindergarten through grade 12 coeducational day school.
- 1837: Mount Holyoke Female Seminary (now Mount Holyoke College) is the first and oldest of the Seven Sisters. It was chartered in 1836 and is the oldest school established from inception as an institution of higher education for women (teaching seminary) that is still in operation as a women's college.
- 1838: Judson College for Women was in Marion, Alabama. It was intended as an institute of higher learning from its inception. It was the fifth-oldest women's college in the U.S. when it announced its closure in 2021.
- 1842: Valley Union Seminary (now Hollins University) is the oldest chartered women's college in Virginia.
- 1844: Saint Mary's College (Indiana) was founded by the Sisters of the Holy Cross. It was the first women's college in the Great Lakes region. It was founded in southern Michigan and moved to its current location in Notre Dame, Indiana in 1855.
- 1845: Baylor Female College was chartered by the Republic of Texas. It is now the University of Mary Hardin-Baylor in Belton, Texas.
- 1845: Limestone College in Gaffney, South Carolina was the third private college and first women's college in South Carolina. It became fully coeducational in 1970. The college closed due to financial uncertainty and low student enrollment in 2025.
- 1848: Philadelphia School of Design for Women (now Moore College of Art and Design) is the first and only women's college established for the study of visual arts and design in the United States.
- 1850: Women's Medical College of Pennsylvania (now part of Drexel University) trained and graduated the first female physicians in the country and the first black female physicians.
- 1851: Cherokee Female Seminary was the first institute of higher learning exclusively for women west of the Mississippi River. Along with the Cherokee Male Seminary, it was the first college created by a tribe instead of the U.S. federal government.
- 1851: Auburndale Female Seminary (now Lasell College) was a private institution founded by Edward Lasell. It became the first "successful and persistent" junior college in the U.S. and the first junior college for women. It began offering four-year bachelor's degrees in 1989 and became coeducational in 1997.
- 1851: Tennessee and Alabama Female Institute (later Mary Sharp College) was the first women's college to grant college degrees to women that were the equivalent of those given to men. The college closed due to financial hardship in 1896.
- 1851: College of Notre Dame (now Notre Dame de Namur University) was the first women's college in California and the first in the state authorized to grant baccalaureate degrees to women. The university is now coeducational. It became a graduate school in 2021.
- 1852: Young Ladies Seminary (now Mills College at Northeastern University).
- 1853: Beaver Female Seminary (now Arcadia University) started in Beaver, Pennsylvania, and later moved to Jenkintown, Pennsylvania. It admitted boys for a short time at the turn of the 20th century before returning to an all-women's school. By 1907, its name had changed to Beaver College. It moved to its current location in Glenside, Pennsylvania in 1962. In the fall of 1972, the college became coeducational. It changed its name in July 2001, becoming Arcadia University.
- 1853: Mt. Carroll Seminary (now Shimer College) was a women's seminary started by Frances Shimer. It became coeducational in 1950.
- 1854: Columbia Female College (now Columbia College) is located in Columbia, South Carolina. It survived the march of General Sherman and three campus fires. Its day program is still all-female, but its evening program is coeducational.
- 1855: Davenport Female College (later Davenport College) was founded in Lenoir, North Carolina. It merged with Greensboro College in 1938.
- 1855: Elmira Female College (now Elmira College) is the oldest college still in existence which (as a women's college) granted degrees to women that were the equivalent of those given to men. The college became coeducational in 1969.
- 1861: Vassar College is one of the Seven Sisters and was established from its inception as a college for women. It became coeducational in 1969.
- 1867: Cedar Crest College was established in 1867 in the basement of a church. It is now one of the top modern female colleges.
- 1867: Scotia Seminary (now Barber-Scotia College): It was the first historically black female institution of higher education established after the American Civil War and became a women's college in 1946. It became a coeducational school in 1954 and lost its accreditation in 2004.
- 1868: Wells College is located in Aurora, New York. It went coed in 2005, and closed in 2024.
- 1869: Chatham University is in Pittsburgh, Pennsylvania. It was established as Pennsylvania Female College and was renamed Pennsylvania College for Women in 1890, and Chatham College in 1955. Chatham gained University status in 2007.
- 1870: Wilson College is located in Chambersburg, Pennsylvania. It was chartered in March 1869 and began instruction in October 1970. It became coeducational in 2014.
- 1871: Ursuline College was established by the Sisters of Ursuline as a college for women in Cleveland, Ohio. Ursuline College is still a women-focused institution with less than 10% men in attendance.
- 1875: Wellesley College was chartered in 1870 and opened in 1875 as a college for women. It is one of the Seven Sisters and remains a college for women.
- 1875: Smith College was chartered in 1871 and opened in 1875 as a college for women. It is one of the Seven Sisters and remains a college for women.
- 1878: Georgia Baptist Female Seminary (now the Brenau University Women's College) was founded in Gainesville, Georgia. Despite its name, the college was never formally associated with any church or religious group. It became Brenau College in 1900 and Brenau University in 1992. The university still boasts its robust Women's College on its historic Gainesville campus.
- 1881: Atlanta Baptist Female Seminary (now Spelman College) was the first historically black female institution of higher education to receive its collegiate charter in 1924, making it the oldest historically black women's college.
- 1884: Industrial Institute & College (now Mississippi University for Women) was the first public women's college. It became coeducational in 1982 as a result of the Supreme Court's Mississippi University for Women v. Hogan case, but maintained its original name.
- 1884: Vernon Seminary (now Cottey College) was founded by Virginia Alice Cottey in Nevada, Missouri. The college's ownership was transferred to the P.E.O. Sisterhood in 1927.
- 1885: Bryn Mawr College is one of the Seven Sisters and was established as a college for women. The college's mission was to offer women rigorous intellectual training and the chance to do original research, a European-style program that was then available only at a few elite institutions for men. The college established undergraduate and graduate programs widely viewed as models of academic excellence in the humanities and the sciences, elevating standards for higher education nationwide.
- 1893: the Woman's College of Frederick (now Hood College) was established when the Potomac Synod purchased the building and equipment from the failing Frederick Female Seminary in Frederick, Maryland to move the women's department from Mercersburg College in Pennsylvania to a spot below the Mason-Dixon Line.
- 1895: College of Notre Dame of Maryland (now Notre Dame of Maryland University) was the first Catholic women's college in the U.S. to offer a four-year baccalaureate degree.

== Timeline ==
=== Colonial-era schools ===
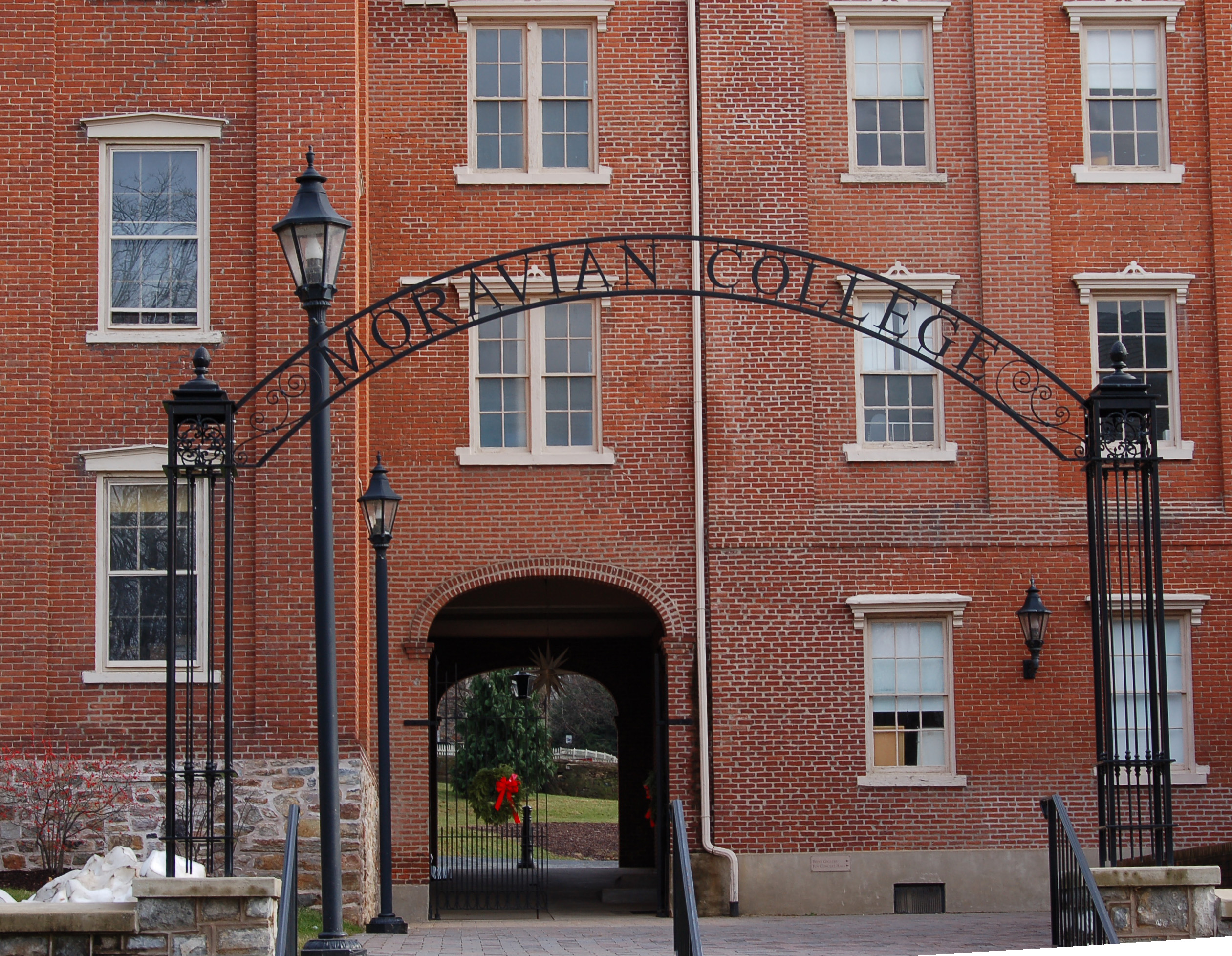
Moravian College, originally the Bethlehem Female Seminary

- 1727: Ursuline Academy in New Orleans, Louisiana is the oldest Catholic school and the oldest school for women in the United States. It now provides primary and secondary education for girls.
- 1742: Bethlehem Female Seminary was founded in Germantown and later moved to Bethlehem, Pennsylvania. It received its collegiate charter in 1863. It became the Moravian Seminary and College for Women in 1913. In 1954, it merged with the male institution Moravian College and Theological Seminary and became the coeducational school, Moravian College
- 1772: Little Girls' School (now Salem College) in Winston-Salem, North Carolina was originally established as a primary school. It later became an academy (high school) and finally a college. It is the oldest female educational establishment that is still a women's college and the oldest female institution in the Southern United States.

=== 1780s–1820s ===
- 1787: Young Ladies' Academy of Philadelphia was the first government-recognized institution established for women's higher education in the United States.
- 1792: Mrs. Rowson's Academy for Young Ladies was in Boston, Massachusetts. Prolific writer and actress Susanna Rowson founded this progressive school for middle-class young women.
- 1792: Litchfield Female Academy, Litchfield, CT: Sarah Pierce founded the school and developed its curriculum. It closed in 1833.
- 1803: Bradford Academy (now Bradford College) in Bradford, Massachusetts was formed as a coeducational secondary school. It became a college-level women's institution in 1836 and became coeducational again in 1972.
- 1814: Louisburg Female Academy (now Louisburg College) was founded in Louisburg, North Carolina. It became the Louisburg Female College in 1857. It merged with Franklin Male Academy to form Louisburg College.
- 1814: Nazareth Academy (now Spalding University) was founded near Bardstown, Kentucky. It was given degree-granting authority in 1829. It opened its current Louisville campus in 1920; all instruction moved to Louisville in 1971. It became coeducational in 1973.
- 1814: Middlebury Female Seminary (now Troy Female Seminary) was founded by Emma Willard in Middlebury, Vermont. It moved to Troy, New York, and was renamed Troy Female Seminary. It became the Emma Willard School in 1895. It is now a primary and secondary school.
- 1818: Elizabeth Female Academy was the first female educational institution in Mississippi. It closed in 1843.
- 1821: Clinton Female Seminary was a public institution in Clinton, Georgia. It was the forerunner to Georgia Female College in Macon, Georgia, now Wesleyan College.
- 1822: Gummere Academy in Burlington, New Jersey was founded by Quaker Samuel Gummere. He sold the school to George Washington Doane, founder of St. Mary's Hall.
- 1822: Athens Female Academy (now Athens State University) was established in Athens, Alabama.
- 1823: Hartford Female Seminary was located in Hartford, Connecticut. It closed towards the later half of the 19th century
- 1827: The Linden Wood School for Girls (now Lindenwood University) was formed in St. Charles, Missouri. It became coeducational in 1969.
- 1828: Ipswich Female Seminary in Ipswich, Massachusetts was founded by two female educators, Zilpah Grant and Mary Lyon. It was the first women's seminary in the nation to be endowed and to offer its graduates diplomas. It closed in 1876.

=== 1830s ===
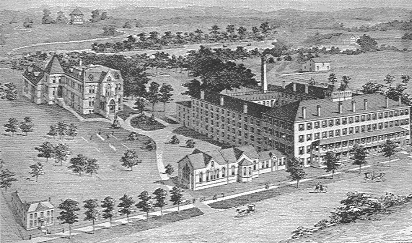
Mount Holyoke College (Mount Holyoke Female Seminary) in 1837

- 1831: LaGrange Female Academy (now LaGrange College) was founded in LaGrange, Georgia. It became LaGrange Female College in 1851 and coeducational in 1953
- 1833: Columbia Female Academy (now Stephens College) was originally established as an academy (high school). It later became a college. It is the second oldest female educational establishment that is still a women's college
- 1834: Green River Female Academy was founded in Todd County, Kentucky as an all-female preparatory school. It became coeducational in 1861. It is located in the late 19th century.
- 1834: Wheaton Female Seminary (now Wheaton College, Massachusetts) was founded with the help of Mary Lyon. Wheaton became a college in 1912 and coeducational in 1987
- 1835: Livingston Female Academy and State Normal College (now University of West Alabama) was established in Livingston, Alabama. It became coeducational in the 1950s
- 1836: Holly Springs Female Institute was in Holly Springs, Mississippi. It was destroyed by the Union Army in 1864.
- 1836: Washington Female Seminary was in Washington, Pennsylvania. It closed in 1948
- 1836: Wesleyan College was chartered as the Georgia Female College on December 23, 1836. It is the world's oldest operating women's college.
- 1837: St. Mary's Hall (now Doane Academy) was originally established as a female seminary by George Washington Doane, the Bishop of the Episcopal Church of New Jersey. It was the first academic school for women in the United States founded on church principles.
- 1837: Mount Holyoke Female Seminary (now Mount Holyoke College) in South Hadley, Massachusetts, is the oldest (and first) of the Seven Sisters
- 1837: Sharon Female College was a church college in Sharon, Mississippi. It closed in 1873.
- 1837: Female Collegiate Institute was founded in Georgetown, Kentucky. It moved to Millersburg, Kentucky in 1848 and was renamed Millersburg Female College in 1862. In 1931, it incorporated into Millersburg Military Institute, now defunct
- 1838: Judson Female Institute (Judson College (Alabama)) was founded in Marion, Alabama. It became Judson College in 1903.
- 1839: Farmville Female Seminary Association (now Longwood University) was founded in Farmville, Virginia. It became coeducational in 1976.

=== 1840s ===
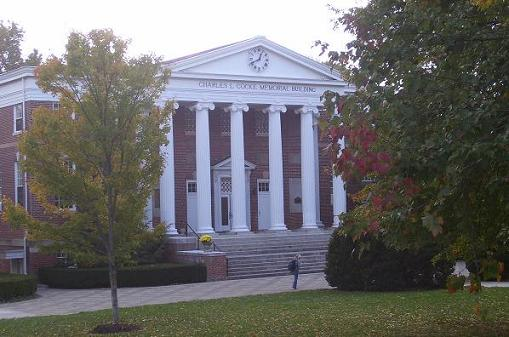
Hollins University in Roanoke, Virginia

- 1841: Saint Mary-of-the-Woods College was founded as an academy for young women in 1841 by a French nun, Saint Mother Theodore Guerin. It is the nation's oldest Catholic liberal arts college for women. In 1846, it was granted the first charter for the higher education of women in the state of Indiana. It conferred its first Bachelor of Arts degree in 1899. It became fully coeducational in 2015.
- 1841: Academy of the Sacred Heart (now Manhattanville University) was founded in New York City. It became coeducational in August 1971.
- 1842: Fulton Female Academy (later Fulton Female Synodical College) was founded in Fulton, Missouri. It closed in 1928
- 1842: Valley Union Seminary (now Hollins University) was established in Roanoke, Virginia as a coeducational school; it became a school for women in 1852. It was renamed Hollins Institute in 1855, Hollins College in 1911, and Hollins University in 1998.
- 1842: Augusta Female Seminary (now Mary Baldwin University) was founded in Staunton, Virginia. It became the Mary Baldwin Seminary in 1895, Mary Baldwin College in 1923, and Mary Baldwin University in 2016. While the school has had a coeducational adult degree program since 1977 and later added coeducational graduate degree programs, its traditional Residential College, was not open to men until 2017. Its Virginia Women's Institute for Leadership cadet corps remains women-only.
- 1843: Memphis Conference Female Institute (later Lambuth University) became coeducational in 1923. It closed in 2011; the former Lambuth campus now houses a branch campus of the University of Memphis.
- 1843: Port Gibson Female College in Port Gibson, Mississippi closed in 1908
- 1844: Saint Mary's College (Indiana) was founded by the Sisters of the Holy Cross. In the mid-1950s, it became the first college in the U.S. to grant advanced degrees in theology to women.
- 1845: Baylor Female Department (now University of Mary Hardin–Baylor) was established alongside Baylor University and obtained separate charter in 1866. It moved to Belton, Texas in 1886. Later names were Baylor Female College, Baylor College for Women, Mary Hardin-Baylor College, and finally the University of Mary Hardin–Baylor.
- 1845: Limestone Springs Female High School (now Limestone University) was founded in Gaffney, South Carolina. It began accepting non-residential male students in the 1920s and became fully coeducational in the late 1960s.
- 1846: Greensboro Female College (now Greensboro College) was charted in 1838 in Greensboro, North Carolina. It is now a coeducational school.
- 1846: Illinois Conference Female Academy was founded in Jacksonville, Illinois. In 1969, it merged with the MacMurray College for Men, forming the coeducational school MacMurray College. It closed in May 2020.
- 1847: Kentucky Female Orphan School (now Midway University) was the only women's college in Kentucky until 2016 when it began admitting male undergraduate students.
- 1847: Academy of Mount Saint Vincent (now University of Mount Saint Vincent) was founded by the Sisters of Charity of New York. It moved from Manhattan to its current Riverdale, Bronx site in 1850. It became a degree-granting, four-year liberal arts college in 1911. It became coeducational in 1974.
- 1848: Philadelphia School of Design for Women (now Moore College of Art and Design) is the first and only art school which is a women's college.
- 1848: Chowan Baptist Female Institute (now Chowan University) is in Murfreesboro, North Carolina. It became Chowan College in 1910 when it began awarding baccalaureate degrees. It began admitting male students in 1931.
- 1848: Drexel University College of Medicine in Philadelphia, Pennsylvania is now, after several changes, the coeducational medical school of Drexel University.
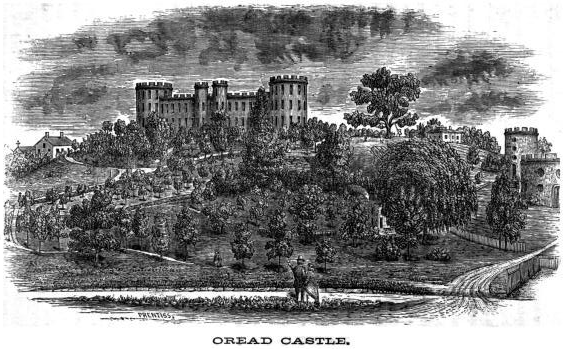
  Oread Institute in Worcester, Massachusetts, 1849
- 1849: The Oread Institute was it Worcester, Massachusetts. It closed in 1881.
- 1849: Forsyth Female Collegiate Institute: It became Tift College, which is now a part of Mercer University.

=== 1850s ===
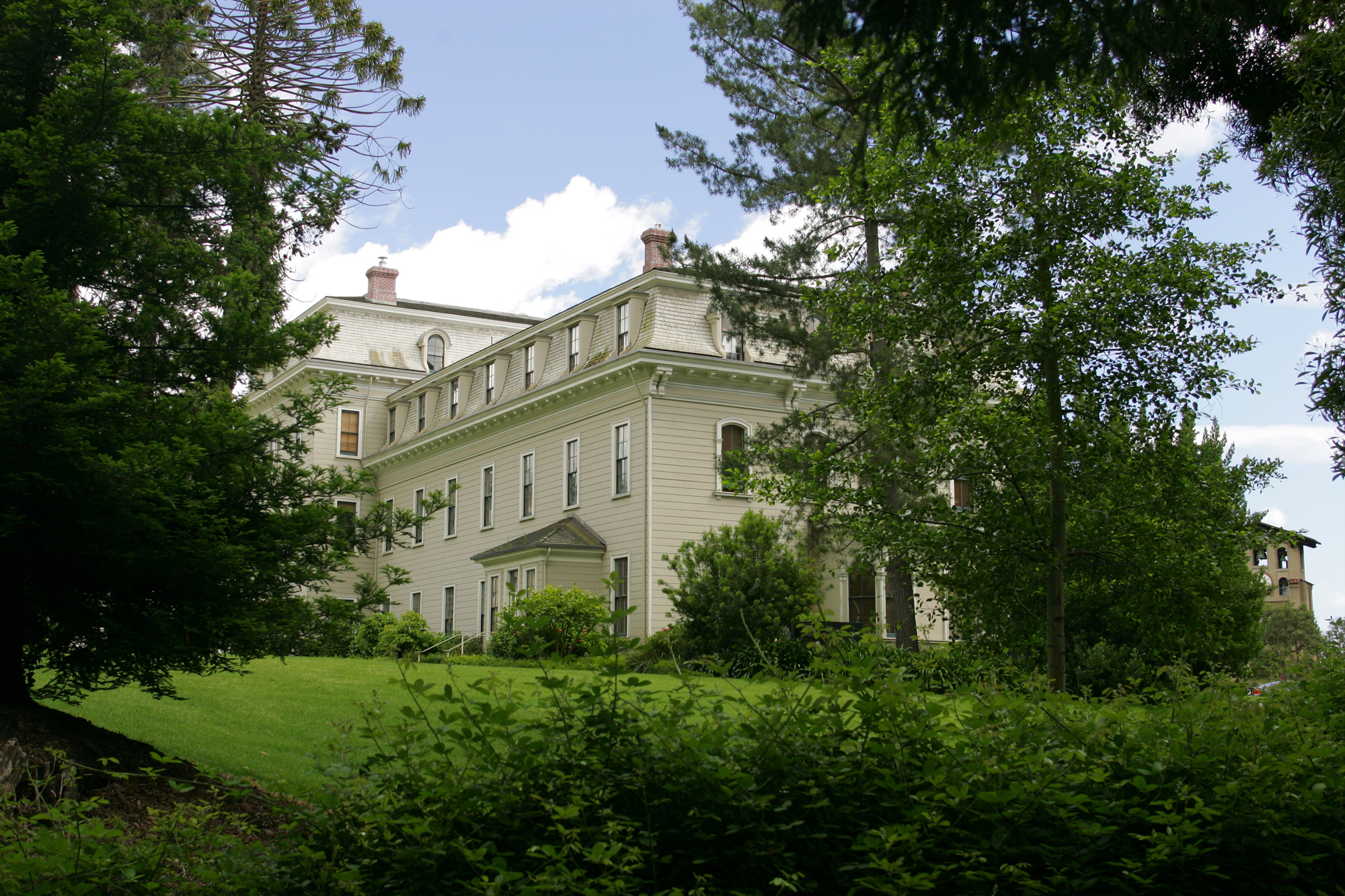
Mills College at Northeastern University in Oakland, California

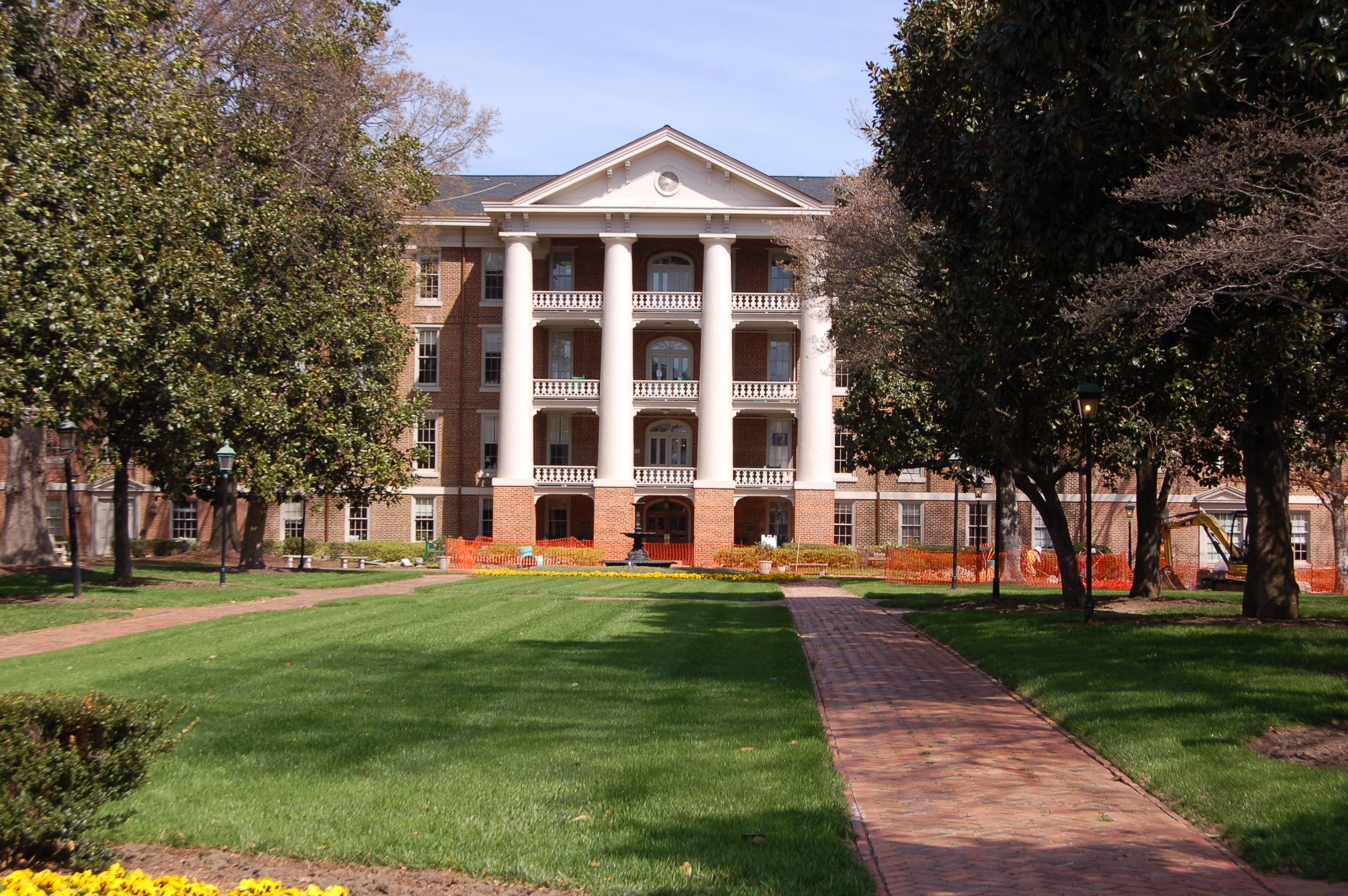
Peace College in Raleigh, North Carolina

- 1850: Women's Medical College of Pennsylvania (now part of Drexel University) trained and graduated the first female physicians and the first black female physicians in the country.
- 1850: Carolina Female College was established in Anson County by an act of the North Carolina legislature. It closed in 1867 for financial reasons.
- 1851: Christian College (later Columbia College) was the first women's college west of the Mississippi River to be chartered by a state legislature.
- 1851: Cherokee Female Seminary is the first institute of higher learning exclusively for women west of the Mississippi River. Along with the Cherokee Male Seminary, this was the first college created by a tribe instead of the United States federal government.
- 1851: Tennessee and Alabama Female Institute (later Mary Sharp College) was the first women's college to grant college degrees to women that were the equivalent of those given to men. The college closed due to financial hardship in 1896.
- 1851: Yalobusha Female Institute was later known as the Emma Mercer Institute and Grenada Female College. It closed in 1936 for financial reasons.
- 1852: Young Ladies Seminary (now Mills College at Northeastern University) was the first women's college in the United States west of the Rocky Mountains. It merged with Northeastern University in 2022.
- 1853: Beaver Female Seminary (now Arcadia University) became coeducational in the late 19th century. In 1907, it became Beaver College and enrollment was again limited to women. It became coeducational again in 1973.
- 1853: Ohio Wesleyan Female College merged with Ohio Wesleyan University in 1877
- 1853: Mt. Carroll Seminary became Frances Shimer Academy and Shimer College. It became coeducational in 1950. In 2017, it became part of North Central College in Naperville, Illinois.
- 1853: Hagerstown Female Seminary (later Kee Mar College) was in Hagerstown, Maryland. It closed in 1911.
- 1854: Columbia College in Columbia, South Carolina was a women's liberal arts college. It became fully coeducational in 2020.
- 1854: Andrew Female College (now Andrew College) was in Cuthbert, Georgia. It became coeducational in 1956.
- 1854: Transylvania Female Institute (now Sayre School) in Lexington, Kentucky was renamed Sayre Female Institute in honor of its founder in 1855. It was chartered in 1856 to confer collegiate degrees; and continues today as a private coeducational college preparatory school.
- 1854: Florence Synodical Female College, one of the largest colleges for girls in the South, declined after the establishment of the State Normal School, and closed before the turn of the century.
- 1855: Elmira Female College (now Elmira College) is the oldest college still in existence which, as a women's college, granted degrees to women that were the equivalent of those given to men. It became coeducational in 1969.
- 1855: Mansfield Female College merged into Centenary College of Louisiana in 1930.
- 1855: Western Female Seminary became Western College for Women. It merged with Miami University in 1974.
- 1855: Davenport Female College was in Lenoir, NC. It was chartered by the North Carolina General Assembly in 1859. It later became the Davenport College and merged with Greensboro College in 1938.
- 1857: Athens Female College (now Tennessee Wesleyan University) in Athens, Tennessee became East Tennessee Wesleyan College in 1866 and a university the next year.
- 1857: Peace Institute (now William Peace University) in Raleigh, North Carolina became coeducational in 2012.
- 1857: Charlotte Female Institute (now Queens University of Charlotte) in Charlotte, North Carolina became Queens College in 1917. It became the coeducational after World War II. Its name changed to Queens University of Charlotte in 1987.
- 1857: Corona Female College was in Corinth, Mississippi. During the Civil War, it was used as a hospital by the Union Army in 1862 and was destroyed in 1864.
- 1858: Susquehanna Female College was in Selinsgrove, Pennsylvania. When it closed in 1872, its students transferred to the Missionary Institute of the Evangelical Lutheran Church, now Susquehanna University.
- 1858: Whitworth Female College in Brookhaven, Mississippi became a two-year school associated with Millsaps College in 1928. It ceased operations and merged with Millsaps in 1938 because of financial difficulties.

=== 1860s ===
- 1860: Fauquier Institute was in Warrenton, Virginia. It offered primary, secondary, and college education. It closed in the late 1920s.
- 1861: Vassar College was the first of the Seven Sisters, established as a college for women. It became coeducational in 1969.
- 1864: Visitation Academy later became Ottumwa Heights College. It closed in 1980
- 1865: Meridian Female College was founded in 1865 in Meridian, Mississippi by members of the Mississippi Baptist Convention. It closed by 1904.
- 1866: Baylor Female College (now University of Mary Hardin–Baylor) was originally the Female Department of Baylor University, founded in 1845. It obtained a charter and separated from Baylor. In 1971, it became the coeducational University of Mary Hardin–Baylor.
- 1867: Lehigh Female Academy (now Cedar Crest College) is a private liberal arts women's college in Allentown, Pennsylvania. Men may pursue any master's degree, bachelor's degree, certification, or certificate program through evening and weekend study and are welcome to study nursing and nuclear medicine by day.
- 1867: Home School for Girls (now Southern Virginia University) was founded as a secondary school. It added junior college classes in 1922, by which time it was known as Southern Seminary and Junior College. It became coeducational in 1994.
- 1867: Scotia Seminary (now Barber–Scotia College) was the first historically black female institution of higher education established after the Civil War. It started as a seminary and became a women's college in 1946. It became coeducational in 1954 and lost its accreditation in 2004.
- 1867: Lynnland Female Institute was a private women's liberal arts college located in Glendale, Kentucky. It closed in 1915.
- 1868: Wells College is a private liberal arts college in Aurora, New York. It became coeducational in 2005.
- 1869: Pennsylvania Female College (now Chatham University) awarded undergraduate college degrees to women that were equivalent to those given to men. The university became coeducational in 2015.
- 1869: Wilson College is in Chambersburg, Pennsylvania. It became coeducational in 2013.
- 1869: Hamilton College was a private women's college in Lexington, Kentucky]. It was taken over in 1903 by Transylvania University and operated as an affiliated junior college. It closed because of the Great Depression in 1932.

=== 1870s ===
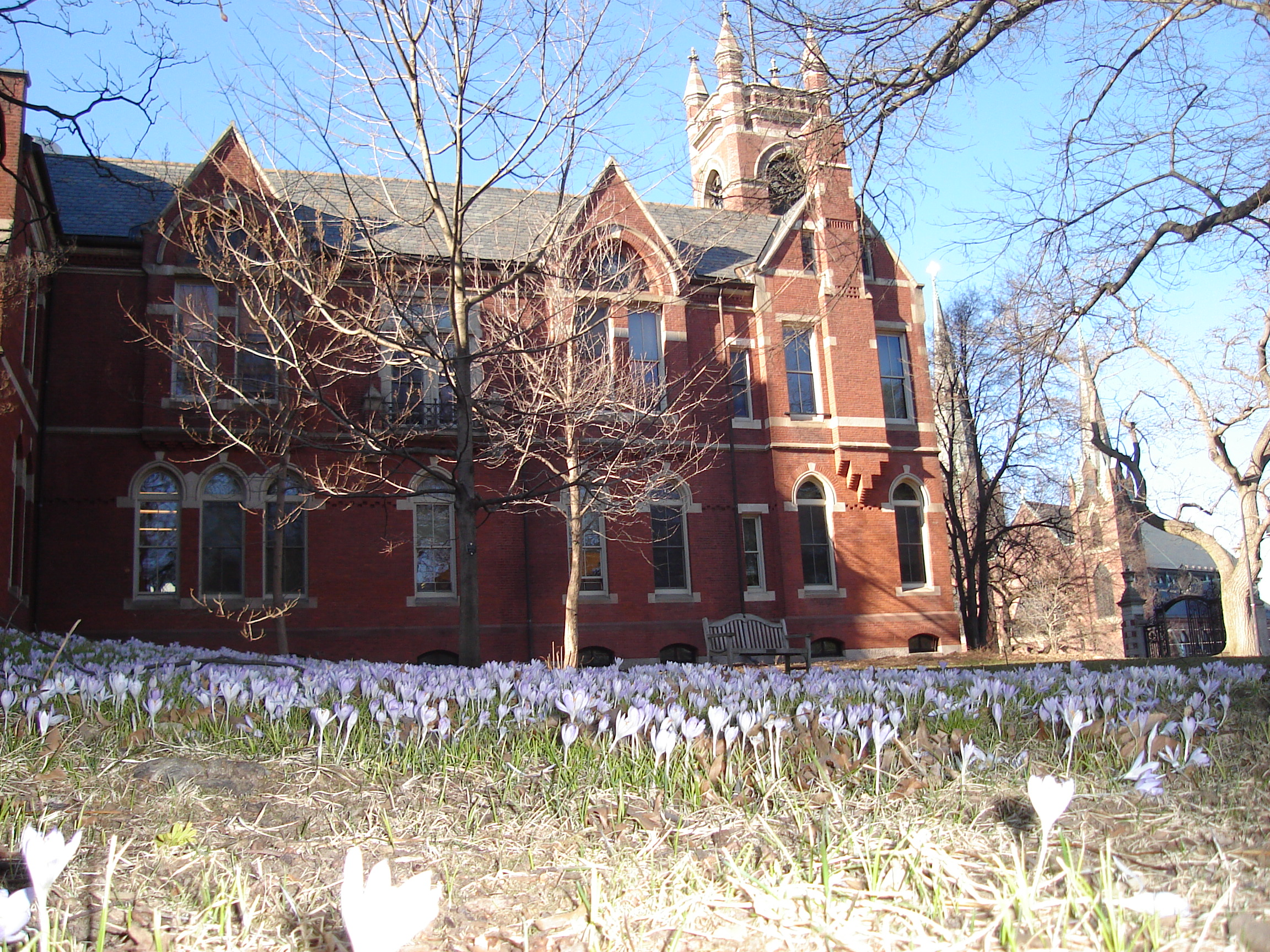
Smith College in Northampton, Massachusetts

- 1870: Hunter College was founded in New York City as a women's college. It first admitted male freshmen in 1946.
- 1870: Martin Female College (now University of Tennessee Southern) became Martin College in 1908 and went coeducational in 1938. It was sold to the University of Tennessee system in 2021, becoming the University of Tennessee Southern.
- 1870: Sullins College was a Methodist junior college for women in Bristol, Virginia. It closed in 1976.
- 1871: Ursuline College was founded by the Catholic Ursuline Sisters of Cleveland in Pepper Pike, Ohio. It was Ohio's first women's college.
- 1872: St. Mary's Institute (now Mount Mary University) was established by the School Sisters of Notre Dame in Prairie du Chien, Wisconsin. In 1913, it introduced a college curriculum, becoming the first four-year Catholic college for women in Wisconsin. It moved to Milwaukee in 1926 and became Mount Mary College in 1929.
- 1873: Bennett College was funded in Greensboro, North Carolina as a coeducational school. It became a women's college in 1926.
- 1873: College of Notre Dame of Maryland (now Notre Dame of Maryland University) is a private college in Baltimore, Maryland. It became coeducational in 2023
- 1873: Blue Mountain Female Institute (now Blue Mountain Christian University) is a private Baptist college in Blue Mountain, Mississippi. It became coeducational in 2005.
- 1873: Cherokee Baptist Female College (Shorter College) is a private Baptist university in Rome, Georgia. It was renamed Shorter Female College in 1877. It became the coeducational Shorter College during the 1950s.
- 1875: Wellesley College was originally charted in 1870 as private women's liberal arts college in Wellesley, Massachusetts. It is one of the Seven Sisters.
- 1875: Smith College is a private liberal arts women's college in Northampton, Massachusetts that was chartered in 1871 by Sophia Smith. It opened in 1875. It is one of the Seven Sisters.
- 1875: Mount Hermon Female Seminary is a historically black college that was founded in Clinton, Mississippi. It closed in 1924.
- 1875: Mount Vernon Seminary and College was a private women's college in Washington, D.C. It was purchased by George Washington University in 1999, and became the Mount Vernon Campus of The George Washington University.
- 1878: Georgia Baptist Female Seminary (now the Brenau University Women's College) was founded in Gainesville, Georgia. It was never formally associated with any church or religious group, despite its name. It became Brenau College in 1900 and Brenau University in 1992.
- 1879: Harvard Annex was chartered as Radcliffe College by the Commonwealth of Massachusetts in 1894 and was one of the Seven Sisters. Radcliffe closed in 1999 when merged with Harvard University.

=== 1880s ===
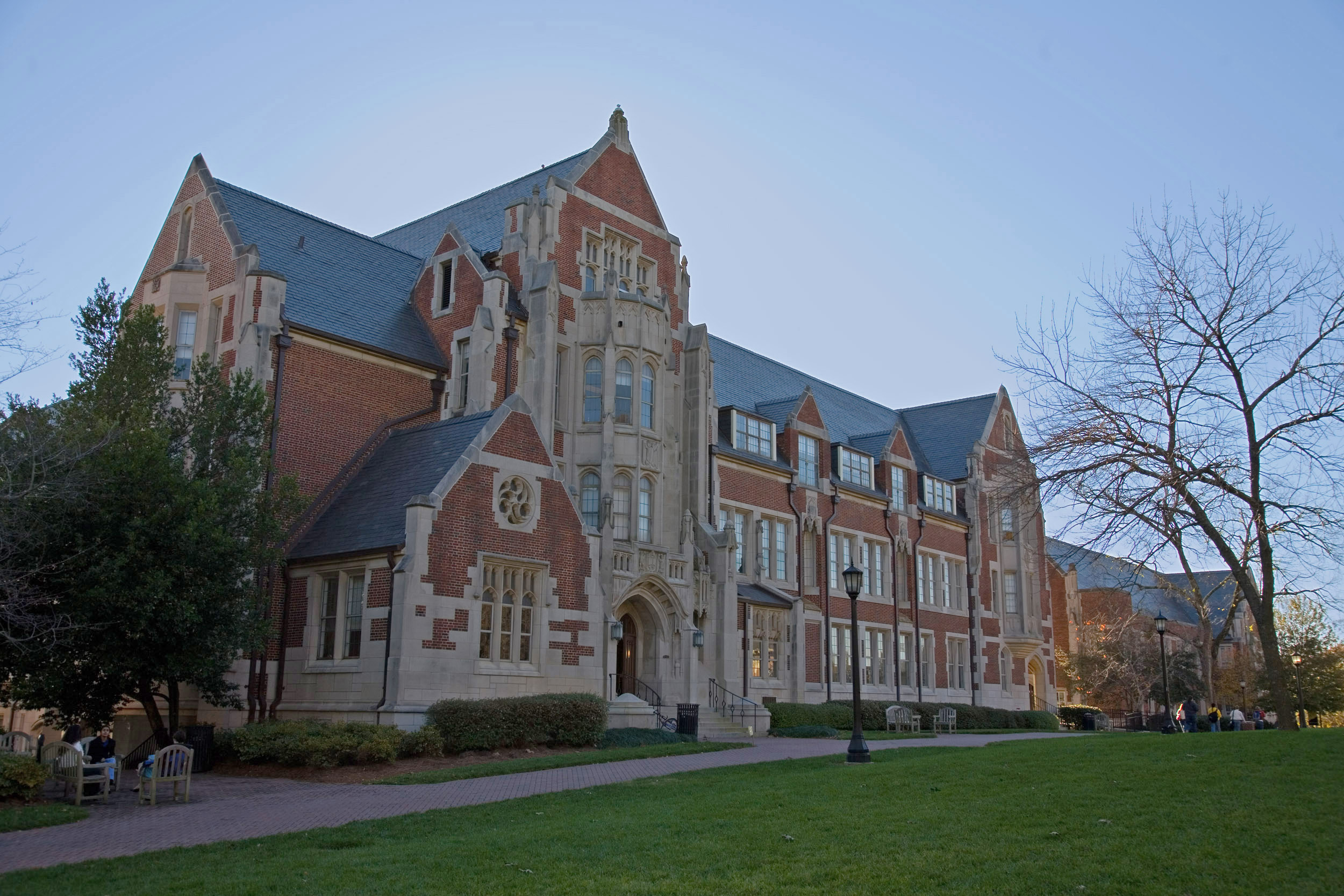
Agnes Scott College in Decatur, Georgia

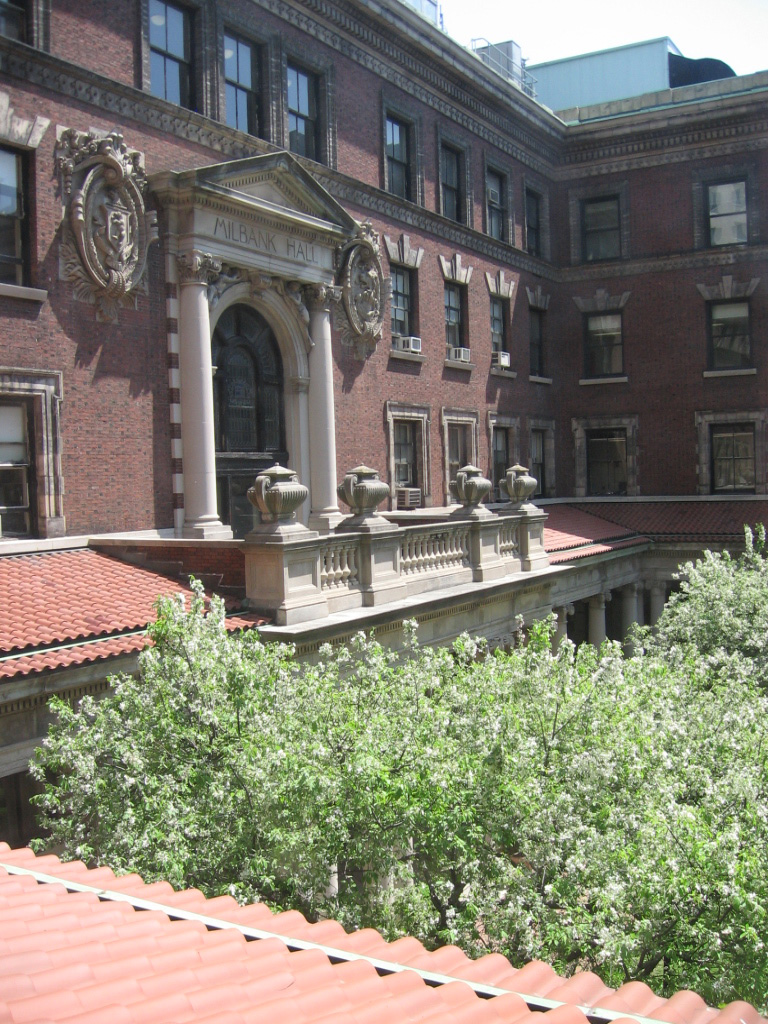
Barnard College in Manhattan, New York

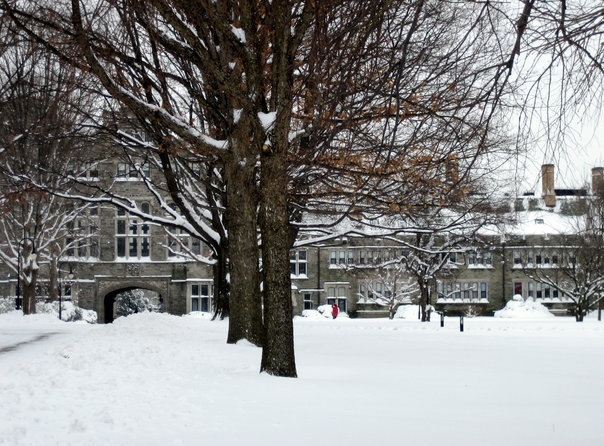
Pembroke Hall at Bryn Mawr College in Pennsylvania

- 1881: Atlanta Baptist Female Seminary (now Spelman College) was the first historically black female institution of higher education to receive its collegiate charter in 1924, making it the oldest historically black women's college.
- 1881: Incarnate Word School (University of the Incarnate Word) was originally chartered as a women's college. It absorbed an all-female secondary school in 1909 and became the College and Academy of the Incarnate Word. After spinning off its secondary school late in the 20th century, it became coeducational in 1970.
- 1881: Tillotson College (now Huston–Tillotson University) is an historically black college that was founded as coeducational. It was a women's college from 1926 to 1935. It is now the coeducational.
- 1883: Seton Hill University was founded by the Sisters of Charity in Greensburg, Pennsylvania. It offered some academic programs, mainly in the performing arts. It became coeducational in the 1980s and became fully coeducational in 2002.
- 1883: Hartshorn Memorial College was founded in Richmond, Virginia. In 1932, it merged with Virginia Union University.
- 1884: Industrial Institute & College (now Mississippi University for Women) was the first public women's college. It became coeducational in 1982 as a result of the Supreme Court's Mississippi University for Women v. Hogan case, but maintained its original name.
- 1884: Vernon Seminary (now Cottey College) was founded as a day and boarding school for girls.
- 1885: Bryn Mawr College is a Quaker college in Bryn Mawr, Pennsylvania. It was the first women's college to offer a Ph.D. It is one of the Seven Sisters.
- 1885: The Woman's College of Baltimore (now Goucher College) was a sister school to Johns Hopkins University. It became Goucher in 1910 and coeducational in 1986.
- 1886: H. Sophie Newcomb Memorial College at Tulane University was the first coordinate women's college within an American university. It closed in 2006; a lawsuit by descendants of the founder lasted until 2011 when the plaintiffs gave up the case.
- 1886: Mary Allen Seminary was founded in Crockett, Houston County, Texas. It became coeducational in 1933.
- 1887: Evelyn College for Women was the coordinate women's college of Princeton University in Princeton, New Jersey. It closed in 1897
- 1887: St. Joseph's Normal School (now Alverno College) was a private Roman Catholic women's college in Milwaukee, Wisconsin. It became Alverno Teachers College in 1936 and adopted its current name in 1946. It offers a coeducation graduate program.
- 1888: Women's College of Western Reserve University became Flora Stone Mather College in 1931. It ultimately merged with several other colleges to form the Case Western Reserve University Federation in 1967.
- 1889: Colorado Women's College, known as the "Vassar of the West", was founded in Denver, Colorado. It merged with the University of Denver in 1982.
- 1889: Decatur Female Seminary (now Agnes Scott College) was founded in Decatur, Georgia. It became the Agnes Scott Institute in 1890 and Agnes Scott College in 1906.
- 1889: Barnard College is a private women's liberal arts college in Manhattan in New York City. It is one of the Seven Sisters.
- 1889: Georgia Normal and Industrial College (now Georgia College & State University) is the coordinate college for Georgia Tech. It awarded its first degrees in 1917 and became coeducational in 1967.
- 1889: Converse College (now Converse University) was founded in 1889 in Spartanburg, South Carolina. It gradually transitioned away from single-sex education, adding coeducational graduate and online programs. Its residential undergraduate program became coeducational on July 1, 2021, with the school adopting the University designation at that time.

=== 1890s ===
- 1890: Mount Saint Agnes College was a Catholic women's college in Baltimore, Maryland. It closed in 1972.
- 1891: Pembroke College was the coordinate women's college for Brown University in Providence, Rhode Island. It merged with Brown in 1971.
- 1891: Randolph-Macon Woman's College (now Randolph College) in Lynchburg, Virginia became coeducational and changed its name to Randolph College in 2007.
- 1891: State Normal and Industrial School (now University of North Carolina at Greensboro) in Greensboro, North Carolina became a college in 1896. It became the North Carolina College for Women in 1919 and the Women's College of the University of North Carolina in 1932. It became the coeducational University of North Carolina at Greensboro in 1963.
- 1891:Baptist Female University (now Meredith College) was founded in Raleigh, North Carolina. It became the Baptist University for Women in 1891 and Meredith College in 1909.
- 1893: The Woman's College of Frederick (now Hood College) was founded in Frederick, Maryland. It became coeducational in 2002.
- 1893: Chicora College was a Presbyterian women's college in Greenville, South Carolina and Columbia, South Carolina. In 1930 it merged with Queens College, Charlotte.
- 1896: Barber Memorial College (now Barber-Scotia Junior College) was an historically black college that was founded in Anniston, Alabama. It merged with Scotia Women's College (formerly Scotia Seminary) in Concord, North Carolina in 1930 to become Barber-Scotia Junior College.
- 1897: Trinity College (now Trinity Washington University) was founded by the Sisters of Notre Dame de Namur as the nation's first Catholic liberal arts college for women. It became Trinity Washington University in 2004.
- 1897: Bay Path Institute (now Bay Path University) started as a coeducational institute in Springfield, Massachusetts. It became a women's college in 1945 when it moved to Longmeadow, Massachusetts and was renamed Bay Path Secretarial School.
- 1899: Simmons College (now Simmons University) was a private women's college in Boston, Massachusetts. Today, its undergraduate program is women-focused while its graduate programs are co-educational.
- 1899: College of Saint Elizabeth (now Saint Elizabeth University) is a Catholic college that became coeducational in 2020. It achieved university status in 2021.

=== 1900s ===
- 1901: Sweet Briar College is a private women's liberal arts college in Sweet Briar, Amherst County, Virginia.
- 1901: Girls Industrial College (now Texas Woman's University) was founded in Denton, Texas and has been known as Texas Woman's University since 1957. Technically coeducational since 1994, it still has a primarily female student body.
- 1901: St. Clara's College (now Dominican University) was renamed Rosary College in 1922. It became coeducational in 1970 and changed its name to Dominican University in 1997.
- 1903: Margaret Morrison Carnegie College was the coordinate women's college of Carnegie Mellon University between 1903 and 1973.
- 1903: Young Woman's Industrial Club (now Skidmore College) would become Skidmore College of the Arts in 1911, and then shortened its name to Skidmore College in 1922. It went coeducational in 1971.
- 1904: College of St. Angela (now College of New Rochelle) was founded by Mother Irene Gill, OSU of the Ursuline Order as the first Catholic women's college in New York. The name was changed to the College of New Rochelle in 1910.
- 1905: Florida State College for Women (now Florida State University) originated from the coeducational West Florida Seminary that was formed in 1851. After multiple name changes, it was converted into a women's college in 1905. The school returned to coeducation in 1947 and changed its name to the current Florida State University.
- 1905: College of St. Catherine (now St. Catherine University) is a private Catholic university in Saint Paul, Minnesota. It became a university in 2009.
- 1907: College of Saint Teresa was a Catholic women's college in Winona, Minnesota. Started a women's seminary, it became a college in 1907 that was operated by the Sisters of Saint Francis of Rochester, Minnesota. It closed in 1989.
- 1908: Marymount College, Tarrytown became part of Fordham University in 2000. It closed in 2007.
- 1908: All Saints' College was an Episcopal women's college in Vicksburg, Mississippi. It began accepting male boarding students as All Saints' Episcopal School in 1971. It ceased operating as a traditional school in 2006. Currently, it provides training to AmeriCorps students.
- 1908: Georgian Court University was founded by the Sisters of Mercy in Lakewood Township, New Jersey. It admitted its first male day students in 2012. It became fully coeducation in the fall of 2013.
- 1908: William Smith College (now Hobart and William Smith) is a private liberal arts college in Geneva, New York. It eventually became a coordinate college known as Hobart and William Smith
- 1908: The State Normal and Industrial School for Women at Harrisonburg: Founded as a junior college, it began awarding bachelor's degrees in 1916, and changed its name three times in its first 30 years. In 1946, when it was known as Madison College, it admitted its first male day students, becoming de facto coeducational, although it would not officially be recognized as a coeducational institution until 1966. In 1976, it adopted its current name James Madison University.
- 1908: State Normal and Industrial School for Women at Fredericksburg (now University of Mary Washington) developed as a normal and manual arts school and was later renamed Mary Washington College. It became the coordinate women's college of the University of Virginia (UVA) in 1944. In 1970, UVA and Mary Washington became fully coeducational. The two schools were separated due to changes in mission and geographic distance in 1972.
- 1908: Oklahoma Industrial Institute and College for Girls (now University of Science and Arts of Oklahoma) became Oklahoma College for Women in 1912. It became coeducational in 1965 and was simultaneously renamed Oklahoma College of Liberal Arts.
- 1909: Lesley College is private university in Cambridge, Massachusetts. It became coeducational in 2005

=== 1910s ===
- 1911: Pine Manor College became coeducational in 2014. Boston College took over it in 2020, with it becoming the Pine Manor Institute for Student Success and now Messina College.
- 1911: Connecticut College is a private liberal arts college in New London, Connecticut. Originally chartered as Thames College, it was founded as the state's only women's college in response to Wesleyan University closing its doors to female students in 1909. The college became coeducational in 1969 and adopted its current name.
- 1912: Saint Joseph's College of Maine is a private Catholic college founded by the Sisters of Mercy in Standish, Maine. It became coeducational in 1970.
- 1913: College of Saint Benedict has been partnered with the all-male Saint John's University since 1955. The two schools have operated a common academic program with fully coeducational classes since 1961. CSB and SJU remain legally and administratively separate, with separate residential facilities and athletic programs.
- 1914: Westhampton College (now University of Richmond) was founded as the coordinate college for Richmond College and a component of its growth into the University of Richmond in 1920. Today, the academic operations of the two colleges are merged, but Westhampton College remains the co-curricular program for undergraduate women and curricular women's studies.
- 1914: Johnson & Wales School of Business (now Johnson & Wales University) started as a business school for women.
- 1916: Russell Sage College in Troy, New York was formerly a part of The Sage Colleges, which consolidated as one institution. It became coeducational in 2020 after the merger with Sage College of Albany.
- 1916: St. Joseph's College for Women (now St. Joseph's University, New York) was founded by the Sisters of St. Joseph of Brentwood in response to the need for a day college for young women. It is the only historical women's college in Brooklyn, New York. It was renamed, became coeducational in 1970 and a university in 2022.
- 1918: The College of William & Mary began admitting women in 1918. Prior to this, in 1896, the college approved a resolution "that ladies of town and College be permitted to attend".
- 1918: New Jersey College for Women (now Douglass Residential College) was founded as the coordinate college for Rutgers University and became Douglass College in 1955. In 2007, it was merged with the other undergraduate liberal arts colleges at the main Rutgers campus, becoming a non-degree granting unit of Rutgers called Douglass Residential College.
- 1919: Emmanuel College in Boston was founded by the Sisters of Notre Dame de Namur as the first women's Catholic college in New England. It became coeducational in 2001.

=== 1920s ===
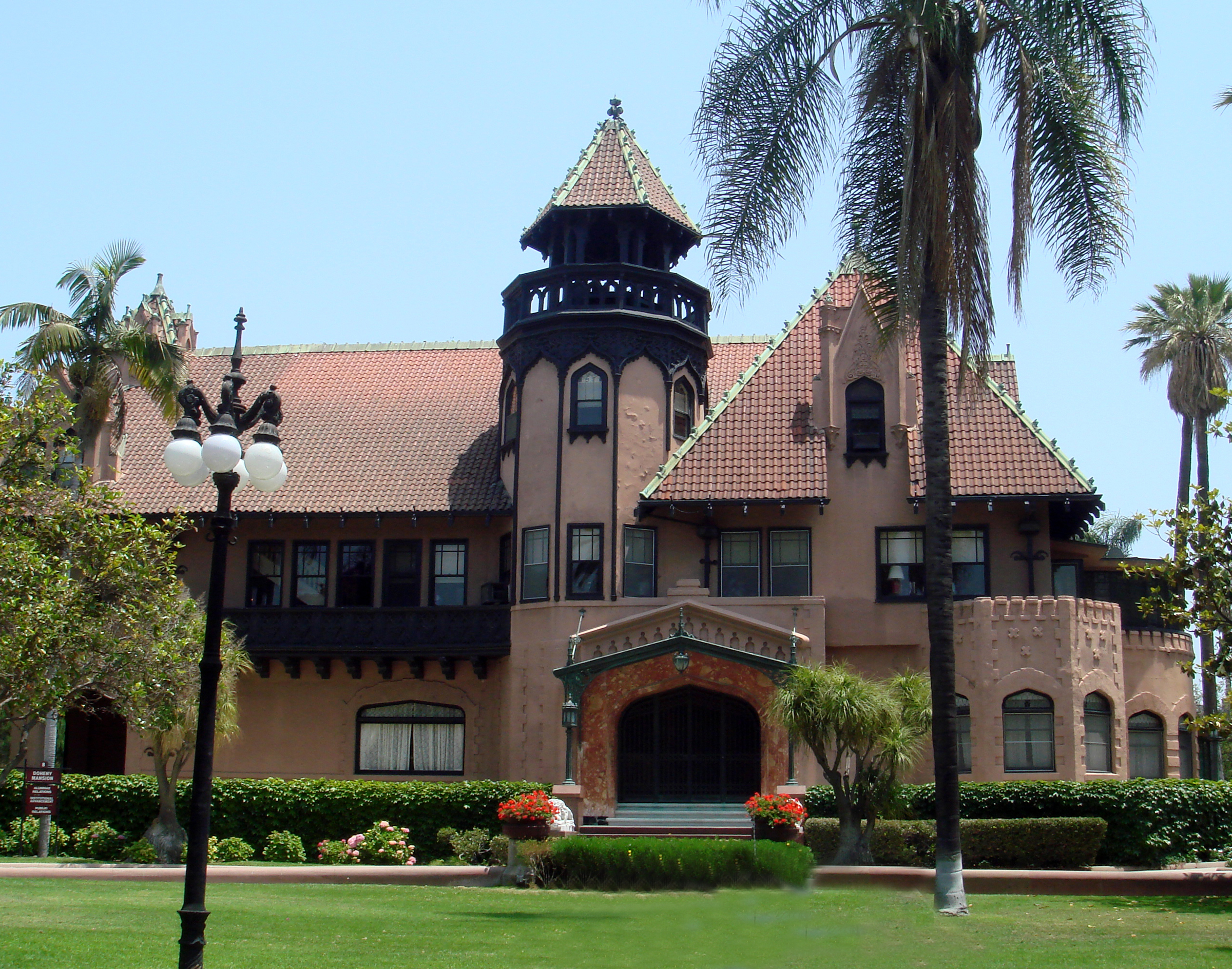
Mount St. Mary's College, Doheny campus

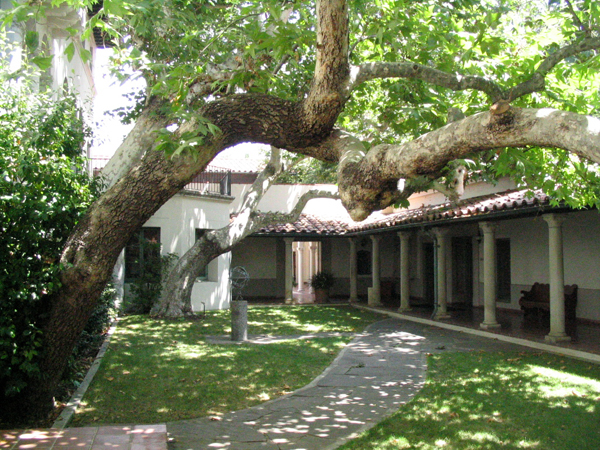
Scripps College in Claremont, California

- 1920: College of Saint Rose was founded in Albany, New York by the Sisters of St. Joseph of Carondelet and became coeducational in 1969.
- 1920: College of Mount St. Joseph (now Mount St. Joseph University) in Delhi, Ohio was founded in 1920 by the Sisters of Charity of Cincinnati. Although chartered as a college in 1920, its predecessor institutions had offered two years of college education for females for several decades. It became coeducational in 1986 and adopted its current name Mount St. Joseph University in 2014.
- 1920: Villa Maria College (now Immaculata University) in East Whiteland Township, Pennsylvania was founded by the Sisters, Servants of the Immaculate Heart of Mary. Its name changed to Immaculata College in 1929 and Immaculata University in 2002. It became coeducational in 2005.
- 1921: Rosemont College in Rosemont, Pennsylvania was founded by the Sisters of the Holy Child Jesus. Its undergraduate program became coeducational in the fall of 2009.
- 1921: Villa Madonna College (now Thomas More University) was affiliated with the all-male St. Thomas More College. In 1945, it absorbed St. Thomas More College and became coeducational. The school moved to a new campus in 1968, becoming Thomas More College at that time. It became Thomas More University in 2018.
- 1922: Notre Dame College in South Euclid, Ohio was established by the Sisters of Notre Dame. It has been coeducational since January 2001.
- 1923: College of Saint Mary is a private Catholic college in Omaha, Nebraska.
- 1923: Marymount Junior College (now Loyola Marymount University) became Marymount College of Los Angeles in 1948 when it began offering bachelor's degrees. It merged with Loyola University of Los Angeles in 1973 to create the coeducational Loyola Marymount University.
- 1923: Mount St. Scholastica College in Atchison, Kansas, was a liberal arts college formed by the Benedictine Sisters of Mount St. Scholastica. It merged with the all-male St. Benedict's College in 1971 to form the coeducational Benedictine College.
- 1924: Mount Saint Joseph College (now Chestnut Hill College) was founded by the Sisters of St. Joseph in the Chestnut Hill section of Philadelphia, Pennsylvania. It started a coeducational graduate program in 1980 and became fully coeducational in 2003.
- 1925: Albertus Magnus College in New Haven, Connecticut was founded by the Dominican Sisters of St. Mary of the Springs (now Dominican Sisters of Peace). It became coeducational in 1985.
- 1925: Mount Saint Joseph College for Women (now Brescia University) was originally located in the Daviess County, Kentucky community of Maple Mount. It opened a coeducational extension branch in nearby Owensboro. The extension branch eventually grew into its main campus, and the school became coeducational when the two campuses were merged in 1950. It became Brescia College in 1951.
- 1925: Mount Saint Mary's University, Los Angeles was founded by the Sisters of St. Joseph of Carondelet.
- 1926: Mercyhurst College (now Mercyhurst University) in Erie, Pennsylvania became coeducational in 1969. It adopted its current name in 2012.
- 1926: Sarah Lawrence College is a private liberal arts college in Yonkers, New York. It became coeducational in 1968.
- 1926: Scripps College was founded as a member of the Claremont Colleges in Claremont, California.
- 1927: Regis College was founded by the Sisters of St. Joseph of Boston in Weston, Massachusetts. It became coeducational in 2007
- 1928: College of Our Lady of the Elms (now Elms College) in Pittsfield, Massachusetts was founded by the Sisters of St. Joseph and the Diocese of Springfield as the Academy of Our Lady of the Elms in 1897. It became a college in 1899 and was chartered as a women's liberal arts college in 1927. It became coeducational in 1998.

=== 1930s ===
- 1930: Mundelein College in Chicago, Illinois became coeducational in 1968 but remained primarily women-serving. In 1991, it became an affiliated college of Loyola University Chicago.
- 1932: Bennington College in Bennington, Vermont became fully coeducational in 1969.
- 1932: Saint Joseph College (now University of Saint Joseph) was founded by Sisters of Mercy in West Hartford, Connecticut. It became coeducational in 1969.
- 1936: Marymount Manhattan College was founded by the Religious of the Sacred Heart of Mary as a two-year women's college as a New York City extension of Marymount College, Tarrytown. It is currently coeducational.
- 1938: Ursuline College (now Bellarmine University) in Louisville, Kentucky, merged into the previously all-male Bellarmine College in 1968.

=== 1940s ===
- 1941: Annhurst College in South Woodstock, Connecticut was founded and administered by the Daughters of the Holy Spirit. It became coeducational in 1972 and closed in 1980
- 1941: Mercy College of Detroit (now University of Detroit Mercy) opened as a women's college and later became coeducational. It merged with the University of Detroit in 1990, creating the University of Detroit Mercy.
- 1946: Mount Sacred Heart College was originally a junior college in Hamden, Connecticut that was operated by the Apostles of the Sacred Heart of Jesus. It closed in 1997
- 1947: Garland Junior College in Boston, Massachusetts was absorbed into Simmons College in 1976.

=== 1950s to 1980s ===
- 1954: Stern College for Women is the undergraduate women's college of arts and sciences of Yeshiva University. It is located in Manhattan.
- 1963: Pitzer College in Claremont, California is one of the Claremont Colleges. It became coeducational in 1970.
- 1968: Kirkland College in Clinton, New York was a female counterpart to Hamilton College. It merged with Hamilton College in 1979
- 1982: Women's College of the University of Denver reclaimed its historical name Colorado Women's College in 2013. It closed in 2020

== See also ==
- Seven Sisters (colleges)
- List of women's universities and colleges in the United States
- List of coordinate colleges
- Women's colleges in the United States
- Women's colleges in the Southern United States
- Women's College Coalition
- List of girls' schools in the United States
