= Southern belle =

Colloquialism for a debutante in the Southern planter class

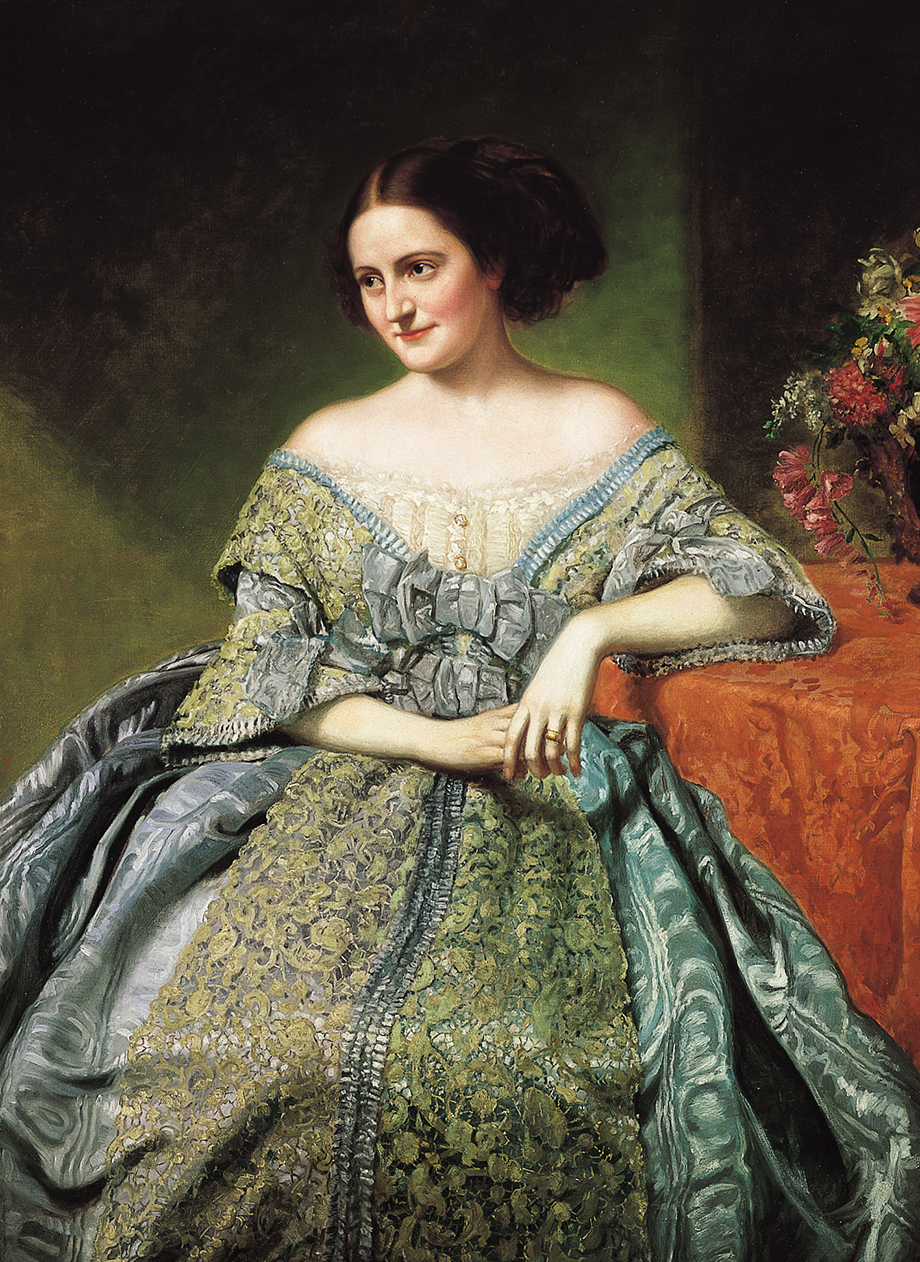
Sallie Ward (1827-1896), a Kentucky socialite and southern belle

The "southern belle" (from French belle 'beautiful'), or just "belle," was a colloquialism for a wealthy white unmarried woman in the planter class, particularly in the Antebellum South (1815-1861). The belle became a popular archetype, and, alongside the southern lady, served as the female equivalent of the southern gentleman. The southern belle image was popularized in the decades following the Civil War and became a key fixture of Lost Cause narratives.

The term continues to be used in the modern American South, particularly in reference to young women and debutantes.

== Characteristics ==
In the Antebellum South, belles wore elaborate costumes, evidence of her family's wealth. Wealthy southern women's fashion closely mirrored that of Europe, particularly that of England and France. Southern women utilized imported goods such as lace and silk from Europe in their clothing, or even bought dresses from European dressmakers. The belle is often characterized by fashion elements such as a hoop or crinoline, a whalebone corset, pantalettes, silk stockings, a straw hat or bonnet, and gloves. Dresses were often created from or incorporated materials such as silk, calico, muslin, taffeta, grenadine, mohair, and velvet. As signs of tanning were considered working-class and unfashionable, parasols and fans are also often represented in art depicting belles.

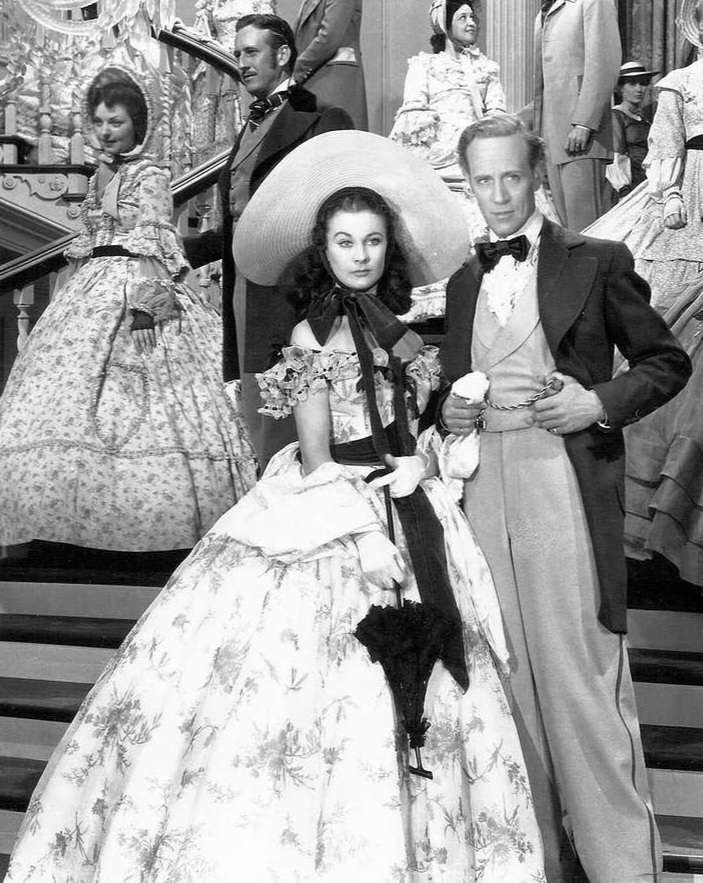
Publicity still for Gone With the Wind (1939) depicting Vivien Leigh in character as Scarlett O'Hara

During the Civil War, southerners became increasingly cut off from European imports by Union blockades, particularly the Anaconda Plan. Traditional southern belle fashion declined rapidly during this period as women could no longer afford or access the luxuries they were accustomed to.

== History ==
=== Antebellum South (1815-1861) ===
In the Antebellum South, southern belles were unmarried, white women in the upper- and upper-middle classes who had entered society. Southern society was heavily stratified, hierarchical, and patriarchal during this period, and the belle was held to a strict behavioral, moral, and aesthetic code that both exemplified her status and was used to attract potential suitors. Belles were expected to be pious, cheerful, modest, beautiful, innocent, submissive, and devoted to their families. These traits were believed to prepare the belle for a successful transition into marriage and motherhood, where she would be expected to submit to her husband and effortlessly run the household. Nathaniel Beverly Tucker, a novelist and political essayist, echoed common southern sentiments when he wrote that, "In the heart of a woman, uncorrupted by a false philosophy that would unfit her for her proper sphere, the proudest feeling is that of admiration for her husband."

The Antebellum South was partially modelled after the medieval period with its “feudal system of lords, knights, and ladies with attending servants;" the southern belle played an important role in this dynamic, and was intimately linked to the romantic mythology surrounding plantation life and the planter class. Resultantly, the question of whether the archetypical southern belle actually existed in significant numbers in the Antebellum South has been the subject of much scholarly debate. Because the South's economy was primarily agricultural, southerners often viewed their lifestyle as a more honest and moral way of life, in contrast to the immoral, industrial North. Southern women, especially belles, were important to maintaining this idealized version of the South, as women were viewed as the moral guardians of the southern lifestyle. Even in the Antebellum period, the southern belle was so intimately intertwined with the idealized Antebellum plantation lifestyle that it was impossible to conceive of her surviving in the changing modern world.

==== Education ====
Marriage was incredibly important for southern belles, as a good marriage could greatly increase a family's social standing. Resultantly, belles often received robust educations for women of the time period, as a good education was evidence of refinement; they were typically trained in etiquette, dancing, singing, textile arts, and instruments such as the piano, and many received lessons in subjects such as rhetoric, poetry, philosophy, Latin, French, and classics. While the majority of women received their educations from family or governesses, some attended female seminary schools such as Corona Female College in Corinth, Mississippi and Elizabeth Female Academy in Washington, Mississippi, which were created to prepare women for "a life of usefulness" in the domestic sphere. Importantly, belles, even those who received higher educations, were not expected to work outside of the home. While wealthy women and belles were not expected to perform household chores such as cooking and cleaning themselves, it was important that they be able to direct their slaves to satisfactorily perform the tasks.

However, these educations were not without criticism; contributors to agrarian publications such as Southern Cultivator, Farmer and Planter, and Valley Farmer railed against the perceived vanity and worldliness southern women and belles who identified as fashionable 'ladies' instead of embodying the humble role of farmwives and daughters. Contributors often juxtaposed healthy, happy, simple rural farmwives against bitter, stupid ladies who were better prepared for city— and by extension, Northern— ways of life. Criticisms primarily centered around the idea that belles were receiving an education that was not adequately preparing them to help their husbands run a plantation. One contributor to Valley Farmer advised young men to "look for the daughter of some good farmer who had taught his family that it is honorable to engage in all the useful employments in which the greater part of the duty of woman consist"— that is, homemaking— instead of "sighing for the excitement of fine dress, fashionable furniture... and all those fashionable things that disturb the peace of young housekeepers."

==== The southern lady ====
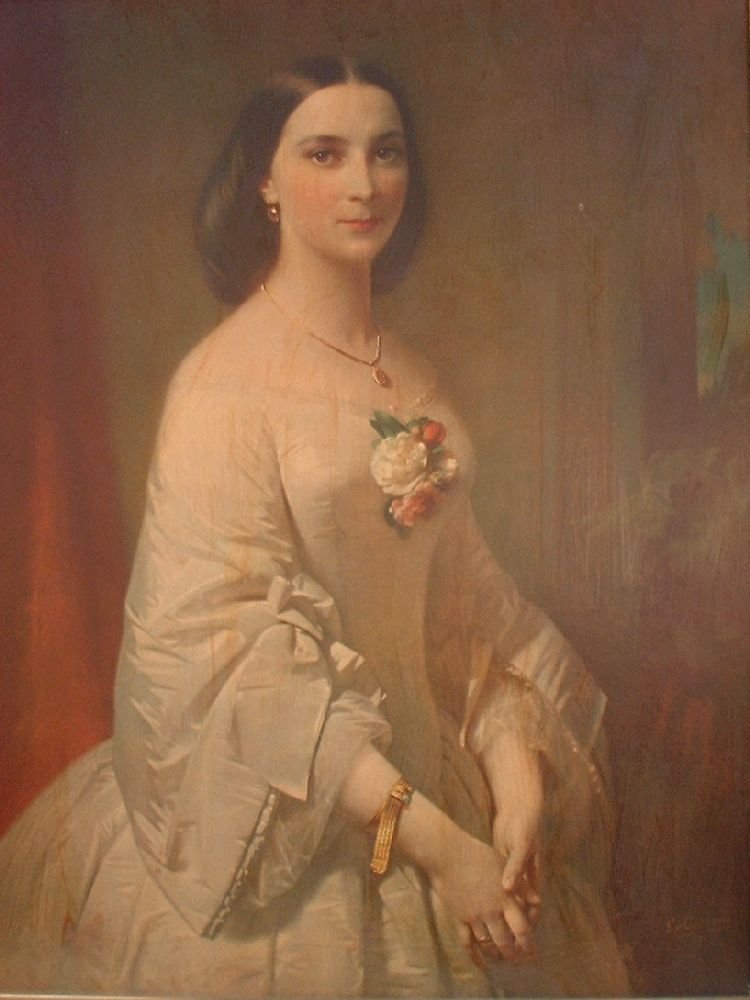
Southern belle, lithography after a painting by Erich Correns (c. 1850)

Southern belles would ultimately grow up and become southern ladies: their older, married counterparts. Once married, belles were expected to be move from being submissive to their fathers to being submissive to their husbands. Under the law of coverture, women could not own property that was not inherited, and, when married, had no distinct legal identity of their own. About southern women, 19th-century sociologist George Fitzhugh wrote that, "[I]n truth, woman, like children, has but one right and that is the right to protection. The right to protection involves the obligation to obey." While belles had more leeway to be mischievous, headstrong, and flirtatious in their youth, they were expected to embody temperance, chastity, and purity in marriage. Some believed that, the more pious a wife was, the more of a positive influence she could have over a promiscuous husband.

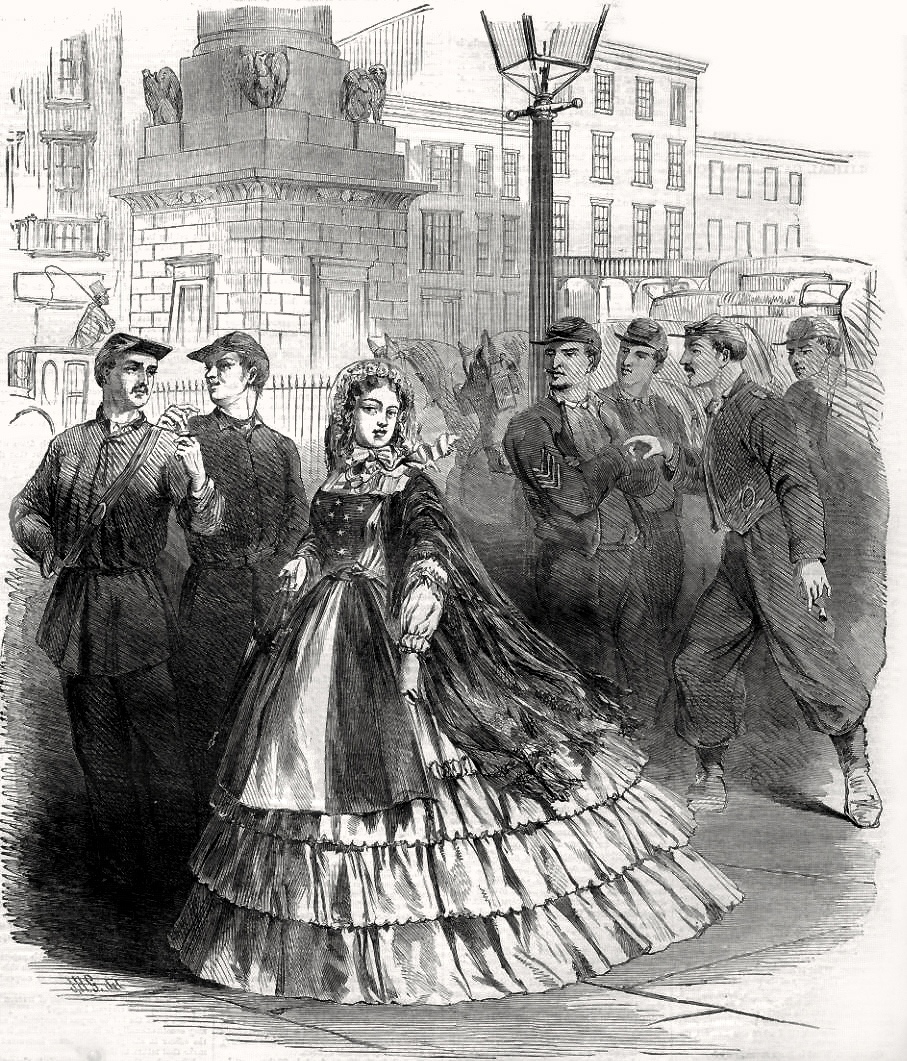
Cover illustration of Harper's Weekly from September 7, 1861 showing a southern belle

=== American Civil War (1861-1865) ===
The Civil War began in 1861 following the secession of slaveholding southern states and the creation of the Confederacy, which was opposed by states loyal to the federal government, known as the Union. At the start of the war, the most immediate impact felt by unmarried southern belles was the sudden lack of suitors, as many young men left their homes to join the Confederate forces. Additionally, the events where they would debut or meet potential suitors— galas, balls, parties, and dances— became less popular as the war progressed and the Confederate situation worsened. One belle commented that she felt as if they were "dancing over the graves of our soldiers" at parties.

The sudden absence of men additionally meant that women were forced to adopt traditionally masculine leadership roles, including the management of slaves and organization of crop production. Women took up chores they had never performed before, including washing clothes and mending fences; young women were expected to assist their mothers in this work.

The Confederacy frequently called upon women to support the war effort. Southern women fundraised, volunteered in hospitals, and created and donated much needed supplies, including blankets, pillowcases, socks, and shirts. Knitting and crafting supplies became a communal effort, and many groups sprung up to organize support efforts and give women the chance to socialize. Women were additionally expected to support the war effort by maintaining high spirits and encouraging the morale of soldiers by writing cheerful letters to their enlisted male family members.

==== Material culture ====
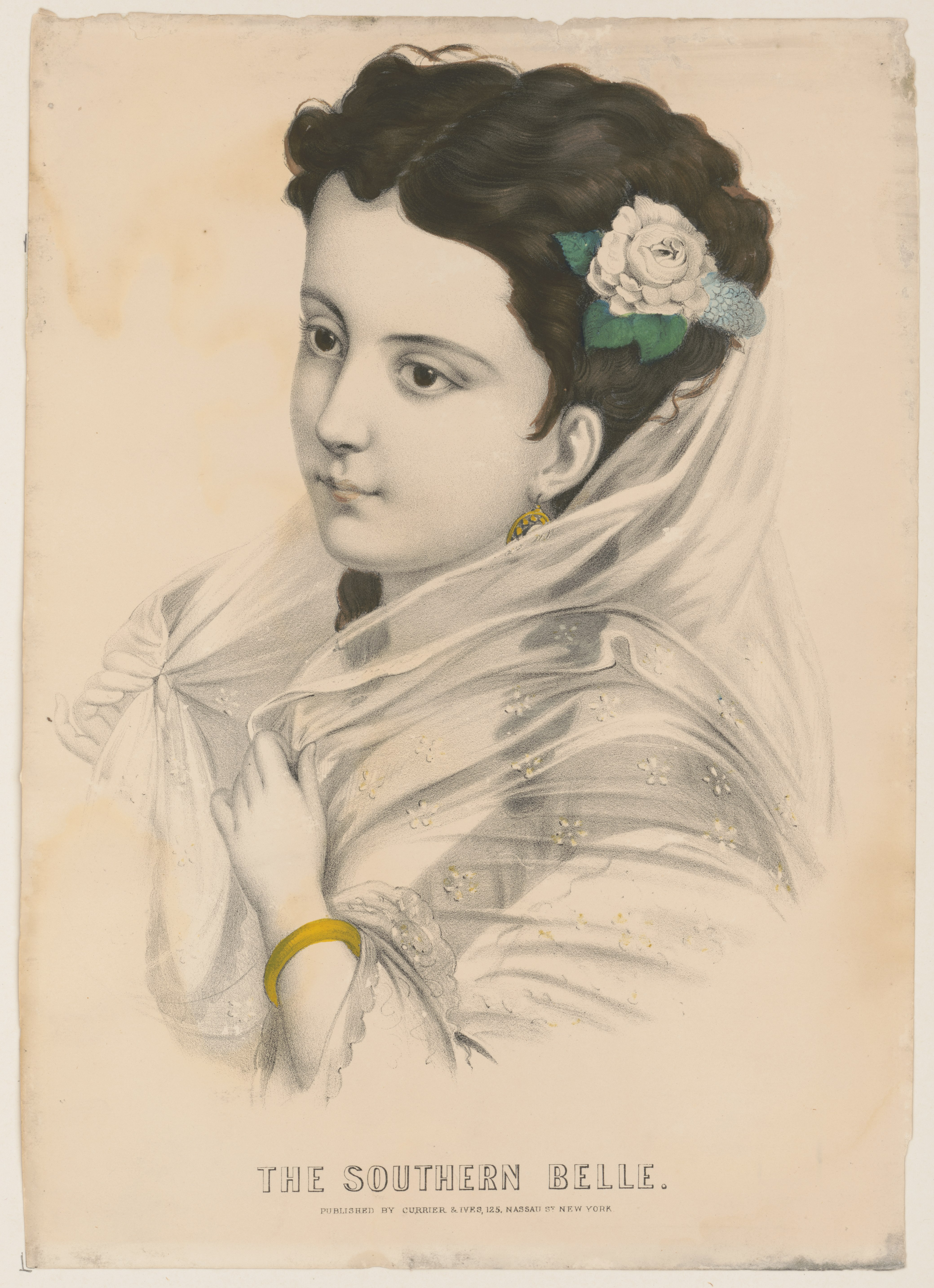
Hand-colored lithograph depicting a southern belle (c. 1872-1874)

Southern belles were confronted with the decline of the belle identity when they were forced to abandon Antebellum styles of dress. In the Antebellum South, belles often wore large, frilled, elaborate dresses, often fashioned from imported European materials such as silk and lace. The Union blockade largely prevented these materials from reaching the South. Resultantly, wealthy women were forced to create their own dresses— often for the first time— out of cheaper materials previously only worn by impoverished or enslaved women. These dresses, called 'homespuns,' became a point of patriotic pride for many women, serving as evidence of their sacrifice, loyalty, and pride in the Confederate cause, as exemplified in the song "The Homespun Dress:"

The homespun dress is plain, I know,
My hat's palmetto too;
But then it shows what Southern girls
For Southern rights will do.
We sent the bravest of our land,
To battle with the foe,
And we will lend a helping hand–
We love the South, you know.

The name 'homespun' derived from many women's new practice of spinning wool and cotton into coarse fabrics that they could then use to create dresses and hats. Bonnets were also quickly phased out, and replaced by hats created from palmetto leaves or homespun yarn. However, while women acknowledged the patriotic symbolism behind homespuns, many did not change their attitudes towards the fabrics. Elite women and belles refused to sew their own clothing, and instead bought exorbitantly expensive goods smuggled from Europe and the North by blockade runners, creating a noticeable and prominent class divide between the wealthy and the super wealthy. This habit extended to other material goods, as many elite women also bought imported goods such as buttons, matches, cookware, and thread.

In addition to homespun dresses, southern women repaired and reassembled old, out-of-fashion dresses. Sarah Morgan Dawson, who kept a diary detailing her experiences as a young woman during the war, wrote that "Confederate" meant "anything that is rough, unfinished, unfashionable, or poor. You hear of Confederate dresses, which means last year's." Aware of the impending capture of New Orleans, Morgan mourned the "blue flounce," "magenta muslin," "pretty barege," and other keepsakes that she would be forced to leave behind. Kate Stone, another young diarist, lamented the futile effort to make old dresses look new again, and remarked that women were excited to receive worn clothing as gifts— something that never happened before the war. In addition to gifting clothing, young women would often exchange dresses for special occasions; some women refused to attend certain important social events all together as they believed they had nothing appropriate to wear.

== In literature and media ==
=== 19th century ===
Southern belle characters appear in 19th century American literature, particularly in the developing field of southern literature. The literary belle was a romantic figure: beautiful, well-mannered, innocent, graceful, virtuous, charming, loyal to their family and to the South. Due to their youth— they were commonly teenagers— belles were allowed to be slightly rough around the edges, with the capacity to be selfish, self-centered, flirtatious, headstrong, and impulsive. Confederate Civil War-era narratives often depicted belles as possessing an innate heroism and strength of spirit that allowed them to withstand turmoil. They were able to handle southern weather, ride horses, and even shoot guns. Less desirable qualities were framed as something that could be overcome or tamed, usually through maturation and marriage. Love and marriage were the ultimate desires of the belle; however, some Civil War and postbellum novels depict a belle falling in love with a Union soldier whom she must eventually reject due to loyalty to the South.

Texts that feature southern belles as romantic heroines are East Angels (1886) by Constance Fenimore Woolson, The Last of the Foresters (1856) by John Esten Cooke, Shannondale (1851) by E. D. E. N. Southworth, and Northwood (1827) by Sarah Josepha Hale.

=== 20th century ===
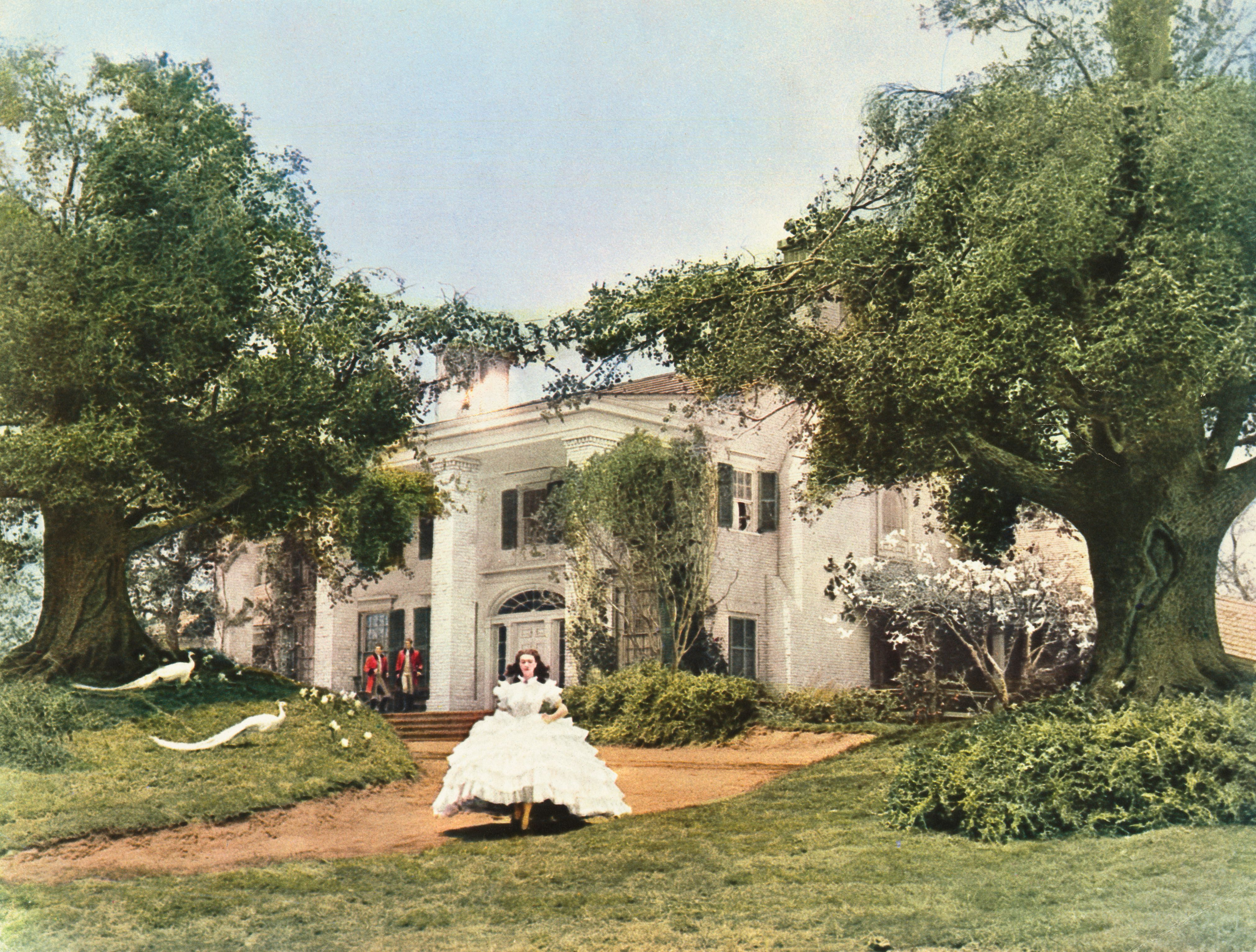
Publicity still for Gone with the Wind (1939) featuring Scarlett O'Hara in front of Tara

The most famous example of a fictional southern belle is Scarlett O'Hara, the protagonist of Margaret Mitchell's 1936 novel Gone With the Wind, which was adapted into a film of the same name in 1939.

== Influences ==
Dick Pope Sr., promoter of Florida tourism, played an important role in popularizing the archetypal belle image. Hostesses at his famed Cypress Gardens were portrayed as southern belles in promotional materials for the theme park.

== See also ==
- Ringlets, a hairstyle
- Chivalry, a virtue of the southern gentleman, popularized in Lost Cause narratives
- United Daughters of the Confederacy, a Neo-Confederate organization and major proponent of Lost Cause mythology
- Sallie Ward, a Kentucky socialite who was called a southern belle
