= Port Gibson Female College =

Female seminary in Mississippi, 1843–1908

- Postcard from PGFC
- Active: 1843–1908
- Location: 31°57′21.7″N 90°58′53.79″W
- Location within Mississippi

Port Gibson Female College was a female seminary, founded in Port Gibson, Mississippi, in 1843. It closed in 1908.

== History ==
The college was founded in 1843. In 1869 it was donated to the Methodist Episcopal Church, South. Unlike many small colleges in Mississippi, the Port Gibson Female College did not shut down during the civil war. It closed in 1908.

One of the college's original buildings now serves as the city hall of Port Gibson.

== See also ==
- Women's colleges in the United States
- Timeline of women's colleges in the United States
