= Meridian Female College =

Meridian Female College

The Meridian Female College was a female seminary, founded in 1865 in Meridian, Mississippi by members of the Mississippi Baptist Convention.

== History ==
The school was founded in 1865 by Rev. John B. Hamberlin. Hamberlin ran the school until 1872, when he was succeeded by L. M. Stone. By 1904 the school had closed.

== See also ==
- Women's colleges in the United States
- Timeline of women's colleges in the United States
