= Republican motherhood =

18th-century attitude toward US women's roles

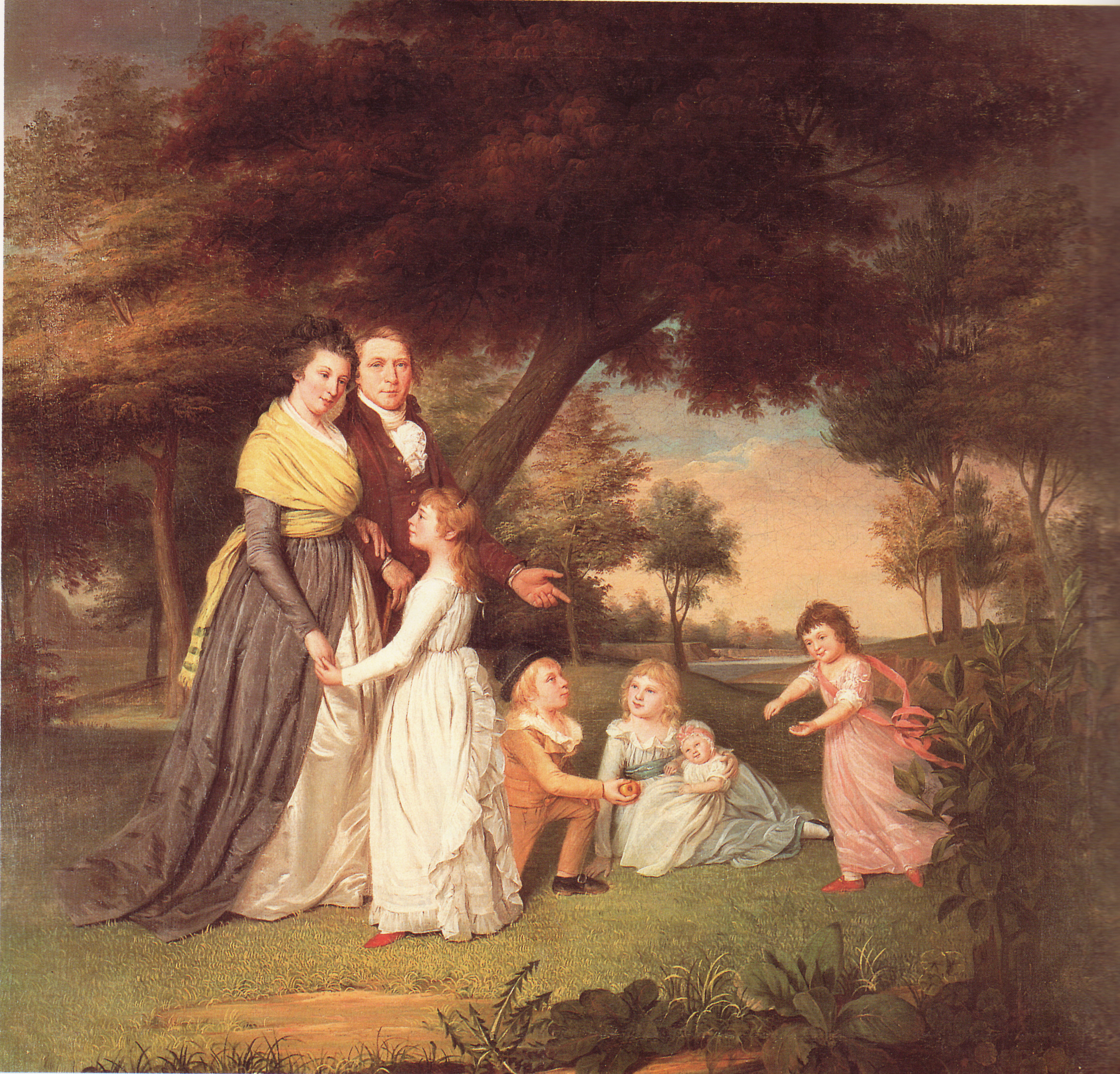
James Peale, The Artist and His Family, (1795)

"Republican motherhood" is a 20th-century term for an 18th-century attitude toward women's roles present in the emerging United States before, during, and after the American Revolution. It centered on the belief that the patriots' daughters should be raised to uphold the ideals of republicanism, in order to pass on republican values to the next generation. In this way, the "republican mother" was considered a custodian of civic virtue responsible for upholding the morality of her husband and children. Although it is an anachronism, the period of republican motherhood is hard to categorize in the history of feminism. On the one hand, it reinforced the idea of a domestic women's sphere separate from the public world of men. On the other hand, it encouraged the education of women and invested their "traditional" sphere with a dignity and importance that had been missing from previous conceptions of women's work.

== Republicanism and women's roles ==
With the growing emphasis being placed on republicanism, women were expected to help promote these values; they had a special role in raising the next generation. In Linda K. Kerber's article "The Republican Mother: Women and the Enlightenment – An American Perspective", she compared republican motherhood to the Spartan model of childhood, where children are raised to value patriotism and the sacrificing of their own needs for the greater good of the country. By doing so, the mothers would encourage their sons to pursue liberty and roles in the government, while their daughters would perpetuate the domestic sphere with the next generation. In addition, women were permitted to receive more of an education than they previously had been allowed. Abigail Adams advocated women's education, as demonstrated in many of her letters to her husband, the president John Adams.

=== Religion ===
Many Christian ministers, such as the Reverend Thomas Bernard, actively promoted the ideals of republican motherhood. They believed this was the appropriate path for women, as opposed to the more public roles promoted by Mary Wollstonecraft and her contemporaries. Traditionally, women had been viewed as morally inferior to men, especially in the areas of sexuality and religion. However, as the nineteenth century drew closer, many Protestant ministers and moralists argued that modesty and purity were inherent in women's natures, giving them a unique ability to promote Christian values with their children. Protestantism had a major influence in minimizing the gender gap between men and women in religion, and although they still did not allow women to become ministers, they were allowed to read scriptures and sing Psalms.

=== Women's education ===
Prior to the Revolutionary War it was a common belief that women were inferior to men so instead of being educated, they were expected to be caretakers of their husbands, homes and children. During the war women were forced to take on many roles of men while still upholding their own responsibilities, proving that women were not intellectually inferior to men. With this knowledge women began seeking their own independence and needed proper education in order to help them do so. Especially influential were the writings of Lydia Maria Child, Catharine Maria Sedgwick, and Lydia Sigourney, who developed the role of republican motherhood as a principle by equating a successful republic with virtuous families. The idea that women were best suited in these roles was based on the essentialist assumptions that they are biologically predetermined to be intimate and concerned observers of young children. By the 1830s, these New England writers became respected models and were advocates for improving education for females. Greater educational access included making once male-only subjects of classical education, such as mathematics and philosophy, integral to curricula at public and private schools for girls. Benjamin Rush was also well known for his speech in which he outlined the reasons he believed women should be able to have equal access to an education and the importance of subjects outside the realm of just becoming a wife.

By the late 18th century and early 19th century, towns and cities were making new opportunities available for girls and women. In 1787, the first school that opened for the purpose of educating women was Young Ladies' Academy of Philadelphia. The belief that women should be educated to further their abilities to educate their own children and become "better wives" became more popular. Despite the growth in women's education, there were still many drawbacks; some girls had to be sent away from home in order to receive their education at a boarding school, some schools would only allow girls to attend when boys were working in the summer and women of color were excluded from education altogether. For those who could not afford an education, schools such as Aimwell School for the Free Instruction of Females was opened which furthered educational opportunities for more women. While most schools were only taught by men, these schools were staffed by women who had graduated and were now able to become teachers themselves. The number of girls' academic schools in the Northeast and mid-Atlantic increased rapidly beginning in the mid-19th century. By the late 19th century, such schools were extending and reinforcing the tradition of women as educators and supervisors of American moral and ethical values.

== History of republican motherhood ==
The term republican motherhood was not used in the eighteenth or nineteenth centuries. It was first used in 1976 to describe the American ideal by the historian Linda K. Kerber, in her article "The Republican Mother: Women and the Enlightenment – An American Perspective" and then again in 1980 in her book Women of the Republic: Intellect and Ideology in Revolutionary America. The historian Jan Lewis subsequently expanded the concept in her article "The Republican Wife: Virtue and Seduction in the Early Republic," published in the William and Mary Quarterly (1987). The early seeds of the concept are found in the works of John Locke, the notable seventeenth-century philosopher, particularly his Two Treatises of Government. In his First Treatise, he included women in social theory, and in his Second Treatise defined their roles more clearly. As Kerber quotes in her 1997 essay, Locke wrote: "[T]he first society was between man and wife, which gave beginning to that between parents and children... conjugal society is made by a voluntary compact between man and woman." In other words, contrary to the traditional sexual hierarchy promoted by his contemporary Robert Filmer and others, Locke believed that men and women had more equal roles in a marriage. Women were expected to focus on domestic issues, but Locke's treatises helped appreciation of the value of the domestic sphere. Although Locke argued less in support of women after he had dissected Filmore's writings, his treatises were influential in highlighting the role of women in society.

== Long-term influence ==
Although the notion of republican motherhood initially encouraged women in their private roles, it eventually resulted in increased educational opportunities for American women, as typified by Mary Lyon and the founding in 1837 of Mount Holyoke Female Seminary, later Mount Holyoke College. The ideal produced women with initiative and independence; as Kerber says, it was "one side of an inherently paradoxical ideology of republican motherhood that legitimized political sophistication and activity." Educated Northern women became some of the strongest voices and organizers of the abolitionist movement, which blossomed in the 1830s and 1840s. Women could only be involved in politics to a certain extent before they were considered "unwomanly" by men and even other women. Working on civil rights for enslaved people caused women to realize they themselves were enslaved by the patriarchy and wanted rights for themselves, giving rise to the Seneca Falls Convention of 1848, and the women's rights movement in the United States. They worked for suffrage, property rights, legal status and child custody in family disputes. The movement likely owes a debt to the emphasis on republican motherhood of fifty years before.

== Republican motherhood and the Roman matron ==
American women found the basis of Republican motherhood in Republican Rome (509-27 BCE) During the Roman Republic women played a much larger role in society than women had in other societies around the world in that period. For Romans in the classical era, the familia, or family, was the core of their civilization, and this yielded relatively healthy marriages between Roman men and women. In Gender in History: Global Perspectives, details the "model marriage" through the eyes of Classical Romans as "one in which husbands and wives were loyal to one another and shared interests, activities, and property." Due to the vital role that women and mothers had in their children's education, they were granted the right to receive and have access to education. This was a rare privilege in Classical civilizations, as women were barred from obtaining education in most cultures around the globe at this time.

During the Revolutionary and Early Republican eras of American history, American women pointed to the activities of women in the Roman Republic—Roman matrons—as examples of how females might participate in national social and political life. As Caroline Winterer has expressed it: "While men crafted a national ideology based on the reverence for the Greco-Roman soldier/farmer/hero, women created the complementary but different ideal of the Roman matron, a pillar of female virtue, the woman who was a married mother, learned, chaste, sober, and dignified." Just as American men looked to male heroes of the Roman Republic and often used Roman names, such as Cato, Brutus, and Cincinnatis, when they wrote, so American wives styled themselves as Roman matrons. Abigail Adams, for example, wrote to her husband, John, as Portia (Brutus's wife) and Mercy Otis Warren sometimes signed herself Marcia (the wife of Cato).

Self-identifying as a Roman matron was one of the ways an educated American woman with knowledge of ancient history could assert her own right to help shape American society. The concept of the Roman matron can be seen as overlapping with that of Republican motherhood, or being one aspect of it. While American women didn’t conceive of themselves as Republican mothers during the Early Republic (the concept is a more recent one, as noted above) they did, however, style themselves as Roman matrons. These American Roman matrons had their portraits painted in Roman dress, for instance, and they wrote using Roman illusions. Mercy Otis Warren, exhorted her fellow American Roman matrons: “Let us resolve on a small sacrifice/And in the pride of Roman matrons rise/Good as Cornelia or a Pompey’s wife . . .” And a broadside posted in New Jersey noted how women in the Revolution “have with Roman courage and perseverance suffered.” This affinity for the circumstances of Roman Republican woman proved long-lasting for many American women. The example in Rome has been used in more recent times all across the world in the fight for women's suffrage, and was a main argument that mothers and women made in the United States during the years leading up to 1920, when the 19th Amendment finally awarded women the right to vote.

== See also ==
- Republicanism in the United States

== Bibliography ==
- Boydston, Jeanne (1994). Home and Work: Housework, Wages, and the Ideology of Labor in the Early Republic. New York: Oxford University Press.
- Boylan, Anne M. (2002). The Origins of Women's Activism: New York and Boston, 1797-1840. Chapel Hill: University of North Carolina Press.
- Hall, Mark David (2002). "Beyond Self-interest: the Political Theory and Practice of Evangelical Women in Antebellum America". Journal of Church and State. 44 (3): 477–499. doi:10.1093/jcs/44.3.477.
- Kerber, Linda K. (1976). "The Republican Mother: Women and the Enlightenment-An American Perspective". American Quarterly. 28 (2): 187–205. doi:10.2307/2712349. JSTOR 2712349.
- Kerber, Linda K. (1997). Intellectual History of Women: Essays by Linda K. Kerber. Chapel Hill: University of North Carolina Press.
- Kerber, Linda K. (1980). Women of the Republic: Intellect and Ideology in Revolutionary America. Chapel Hill: University of North Carolina Press.
- Kleinberg, S. J. (1999). Women in the United States, 1830-1945. New Brunswick, NJ: Rutgers University Press.
- Norton, Mary Beth (1980). Liberty's Daughters: The Revolutionary Experience of American Women, 1750-1800. Ithaca, NY: Cornell University Press.
- Porterfield, Amanda (1997). Mary Lyon and the Mount Holyoke Missionaries. Archived from the original on 2010-12-13 – via Questia.
- Robbins, Sarah (2002). "'The Future Good and Great of our Land': Republican Mothers, Female Authors, and Domesticated Literacy in Antebellum New England". New England Quarterly. 75 (4): 562–591. doi:10.2307/1559860. JSTOR 1559860.
- Wiesner, Merry E. (2011). Gender in History: Global Perspectives. Wiley-Blackwell. p. 32.
- Zagari, Rosemarie (1992). "Morals, Manners, and the Republican Mother". American Quarterly. 44 (2): 192–215. doi:10.2307/2713040. JSTOR 2713040.
