= Corona Female College =

Female seminary in Corinth, Mississippi, US

Union soldiers hoisting the Stars and Stripes over Corona Female College

Corona Female College was a female seminary located in Corinth, Mississippi.

The school was founded by Rev. L. B. Gaston in 1857. It was situated in a three-story building. The college had a lyceum society and the students published a literary magazine known as The Wreath.

Its main building was commandeered by the Union Army for use as a hospital during the nearby battle of Shiloh in 1862, as was the nearby Tishomingo Hotel. The Union Army evacuated the area in 1864, burning the college's building. Corona Female College never reopened.

== See also ==
- Women's colleges in the United States
- Timeline of women's colleges in the United States
