= Kate Stone =

American diarist and community leader (1841-1907)

- Born: Sarah Katherine Stone; January 8, 1841; Mississippi Springs, Hinds County, Mississippi, U.S.
- Died: December 28, 1907 (aged 66); Tallulah, Louisiana, U.S.
- Resting place: Silver Cross Cemetery, Tallulah
- Other name: Kate
- Occupation: Writer
- Spouse: Henry Bry Holmes (m. 1869)
- Children: 4
- Writing career
- Language: English
- Genre: diarist
- Notable works: Brokenburn: The Journal of Kate Stone, 1861-1865

Kate Stone (after marriage, Holmes; January 8, 1841 – December 28, 1907), was an American diarist and community leader from Mississippi. She was the daughter of a wealthy cotton farmer and slaveholder in the Southern United States. She is remembered in American history and literature for her diary, Brokenburn: The Journal of Kate Stone, 1861-1865, edited by John Q. Anderson, which she kept during the time of the American Civil War, printed in 1955, which she kept continuously from May 1861 to November 1865; shorter supplements date from 1867 and 1868.

== Early life and education ==
Sarah Katherine (nickname, "Kate") Stone was born January 8, 1841, in Mississippi Springs, Hinds County, Mississippi. In 1861, the year the war broke out, Stone was twenty years old and a fairly typical example of a Southern belle, seeking to meet the usual expectations of a debutante of Southern society. She was one of seven surviving children of the cotton planter William Patrick Stone, who moved the family to Stonington Plantation near Delta, Louisiana, and died in 1855. After her mother, Amanda Susan Ragan Stone, became widowed, she purchased and managed the plantation called "Brokenburn", and its 150 slaves; it was located in northeastern Louisiana, not far from the city of Vicksburg, Mississippi.

She graduated from Stephen Elliott's academy in Nashville, Tennessee.

== Career ==
In May 1861, a month after the outbreak of the war, Stone began to keep a diary that, as an "ego document", provides insights into her own sensitivities and looks at her social environment, providing a revealing moral portrait of her time.

Stone supported the cause of the Southern States with a youthful-romantic enthusiasm, even though the picture of just war, in which "dashing young officers in magnificent uniforms are inspired by patriotic maidens to heroic exploits," gave way to the reality on how the Union front approached their plantation. In 1862, after the Union's first gunboats took up position on the banks of the Mississippi River just a few miles from their plantation, the skirmishes in the area increased with the Vicksburg campaign, leaving the family in March 1863 to escape through the swamps of Louisiana.

As refugees, the Stones reached Tyler, Texas, where they spent two and a half years - much to the disfavor of the privileged Kate Stone, who disliked anything but refined Texan manners. In this "dark corner of the Confederacy," as Stone calls it, she received news of the deaths of her brothers Walter and Coleman on the battlefield, further eclipsing her mood. After the defeat of the Confederacy, Stone returned in 1865 to Louisiana and found the family mansion looted and the plantation devastated. With the reconstruction, the entries become rarer; the diary ends in 1868.

== Personal life ==
She was affiliated with the Madison Infantry Chapter of the United Daughters of the Confederacy and the Madison Parish Book Club. In 1869, she married Lieutenant Henry Bry Holmes, at Walton Bend Plantation, near Yazoo City, Mississippi. They had four children, Emmet, William, and twins Katy Bry and Amanda Julia.

She died on December 28, 1907, in Tallulah, Louisiana.
