= Young Ladies' Academy of Philadelphia =

Seminary in the United States

Coordinates: 39.953°N 75.146°W

The Young Ladies' Academy of Philadelphia was the first government recognized institution established for women's higher education in the United States. Located on Cherry Street, between Third and Fourth Streets in Philadelphia and founded by John Poor on June 4, 1787, it was chartered on January 7, 1792. It provided young women with a diverse curriculum, notably teaching students about various components of English, science, arithmetic, history, and geography.

== History ==
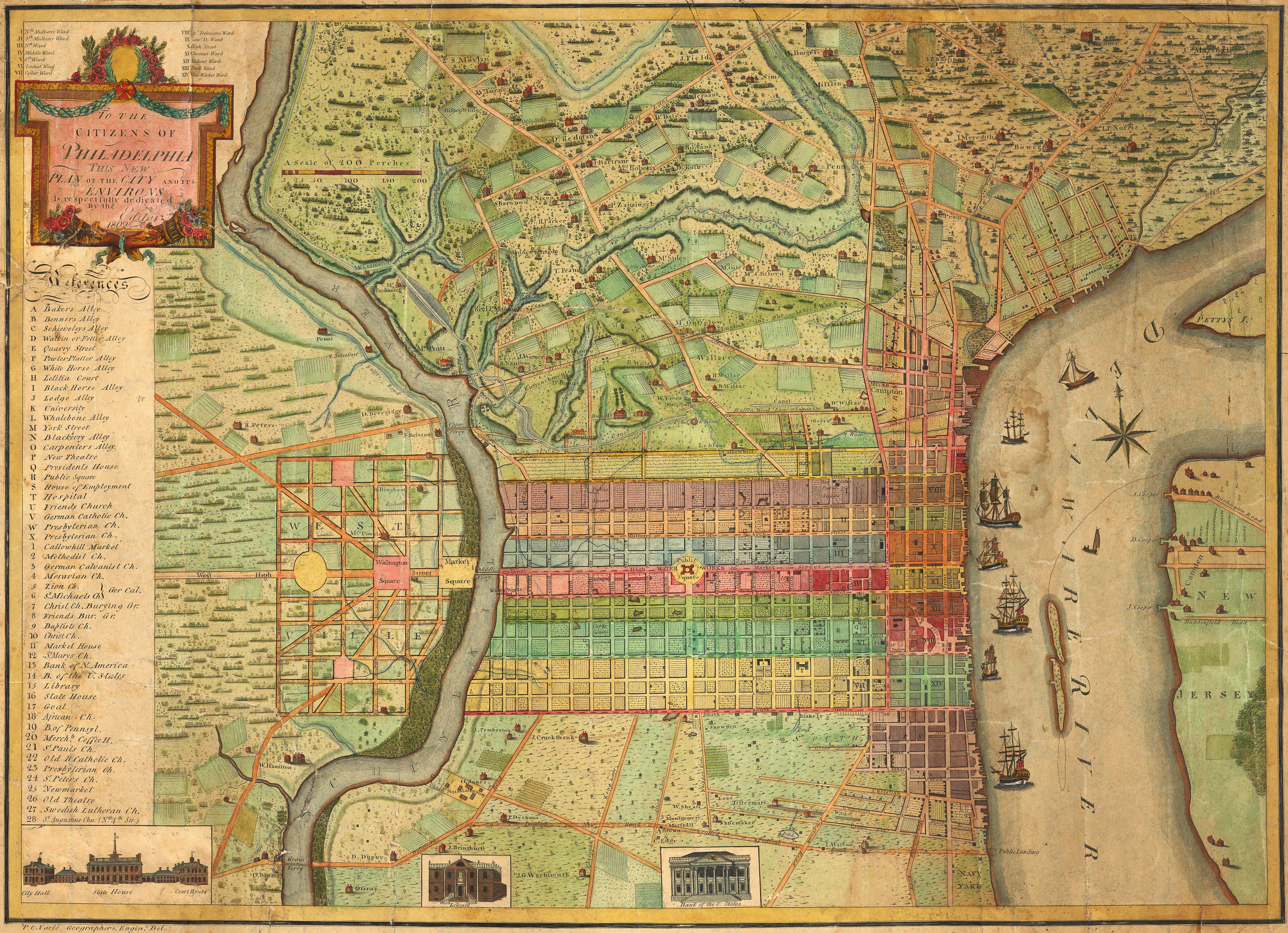
Philadelphia Street Map, 1802.

=== Founding ===
On June 4, 1787, John Poor, native to Massachusetts and Harvard graduate, would found the Young Ladies' Academy of Philadelphia. Located on Cherry Street, between Third and Fourth Streets, in its namesake city of Philadelphia, Pennsylvania. In 1792 with the help of Benjamin West, Benjamin Say, Pelatiah Webster, and William Smith, under the authority of governor Thomas Mifflin, a charter under the laws of Pennsylvania would be granted to the academy. This made the academy the first chartered school for women in the United States. Once established the academy was organized with John Poor as Principal, Samuel Magaw as President, Henry Helmuth as Vice-President, and Benjamin Say as Secretary. With this they would have the authority to award diplomas and premiums of merit to students of the academy. Authority was also granted to appoint a board of trustees ranging from 8 to 16 members to administer the school, with a new board being elected if a petition was signed by any twelve subscribers. Finally, John Poor could not be removed from his position as principal unless in the case of crime, misconduct, or disability whether natural or civil.

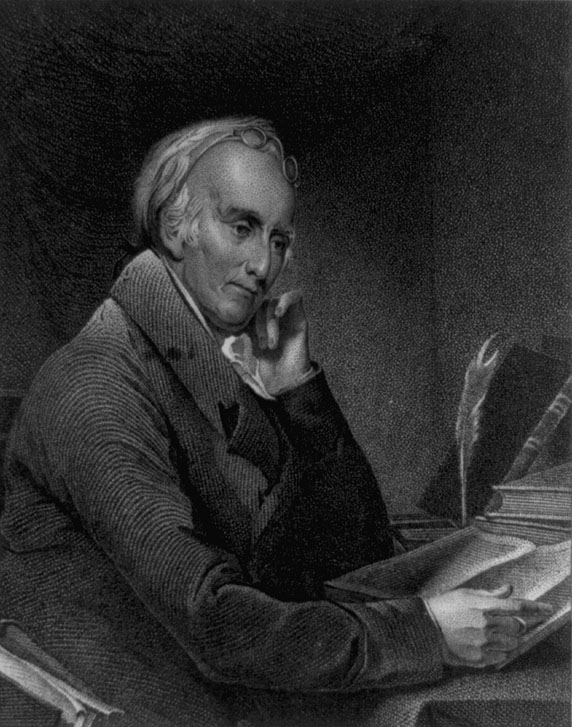
Half-length portrait of Dr. Benjamin Rush, a guest instructor at the academy.

=== Enrollment & curriculum ===
During and after the American Revolution, Philadelphia was well situated as a location for the school as a significant cultural center in the United States. In 1792 recorded enrollment for the academy would be 100 students, but in later years a high of 150 students would be recorded. While most students came from Philadelphia itself, others would come from places like Canada, Florida, Carolina, Connecticut, Delaware, Georgia, Maryland, Massachusetts, New Jersey, New York, Nova Scotia, Pennsylvania, Province of Maine, Rhode Island, Virginia, and the West Indies. The cost of tuition at the academy on March 10, 1794, would be $4 per quarter, and in 1801 it would be at $5 per quarter. Students came from many different areas of the United States and originally held the understanding that they were "scholars" and had an opportunity only afforded to the elite. However, daughters of immigrants and less wealthy students attended the school starting around 1794, perhaps to learn skills to be economically self-sufficient rather than to teach members of the household as expected of Republican Motherhood.

Curriculum of the academy would comprise arithmetic, composition, English grammar, geography, history, music, reading, rhetoric, spelling, and writing. Astronomy was added to the curriculum in 1801, and additional subjects, such as chemistry, were occasionally offered when guest instructors, like Benjamin Rush in 1787, visited the academy. Examinations were given twice a year, the first taking place in December 1787, administered by the principal and at least one trustee. Diplomas would be granted upon passing an examination conducted by again the principal and this time four trustees. The diplomas itself showing that the student had a complete knowledge of the curriculum taught in the academy. The school had a board of "gentlemen visitors," who presented students with awards based upon their performance in an academic discipline or for good behavior, which was awarded to students who displayed proper manners and a mild temperament. Prizes for excellence fueled the school's competitive nature, which mirrored the atmosphere of boy's academies of the time. No other girls' school was granted a charter until 1829, but the academy served as a precursor to hundreds of academies established widely throughout the Republic.

=== Notable students ===
On May 15, 1793, Priscilla Mason, a student at the Young Ladies' Academy of Philadelphia, delivered the commencement address for her graduating class. A speech which has been recognized as an early example of American women's public advocacy for gender equality. Mason's commencement speech reflects the dynamics of gender in the post-Revolutionary United States. In her speech she would acknowledge the limited public roles available to females, and argued that women had the intellectual and rhetorical capability to participate actively in a civic life. Mason would attribute these restrictions to the action of men seeking to maintain their dominance. Her speech would be notable for its assertive style and humor, such as suggesting the creation of an all female senate in order to regulate national fashion trends as way to show women's capability to govern. Scholars have since cited Mason's speech as an important expression of feminist thought in the United States.

On December 18, 1794, Ann Negus, another student of the Young Ladies' Academy, would give the commencement speech for her class. The event itself would attract a large crowd with distinguished guests such as the First Lady of the United States, many members of Congress, the Pennsylvania Assembly, and prominent Philadelphia citizens. Negus's speech would express the importance of educating women, shaping it as essential to the well-being and progress of the United States. She would praise the Academy's educators and founders for seeing the student's education as vital to the community and important to the country. Negus would show that education was not just a personal achievement for the students, but a service to their society.

=== Influence of Republican Motherhood on the Academy ===
Founded in the late 18th century, shortly after the conclusion of the American Revolutionary War, the academy was established during a period of American history when women were expected to engage in Republican Motherhood. Historians often cite Republican Motherhood as the reason women's education rose to prominence in the early Republic. Due to the idea that women were to educate members of their household on concepts of virtue, access to education for women gained broader support. However, women who embodied Republican Motherhood were restricted in the scope of their education; their learning was supposed to focus on serving home and family, that is, the domestic sphere. Historian Margaret Nash describes access to women's education in the early Republic as a means to spreading knowledge to the greater society as a whole, rather than as an end for women themselves.

Benjamin Rush and many other contemporaries viewed the academy as an institution established to promote these ideas of Republican Motherhood. Rush believed that women's education ought to be practical for domestic tasks, as well as include traditional academic disciplines such as history and geography. Indeed, in a speech to visitors of the academy, Rush noted that maintaining the wellness of the young Republic and promoting the values of each citizen being equally entitled to liberty "make[s] it necessary that our ladies should be qualified to a certain degree by a peculiar and suitable education, to concur in instructing their sons in the principles of liberty and government." He himself taught a chemistry course at the academy.

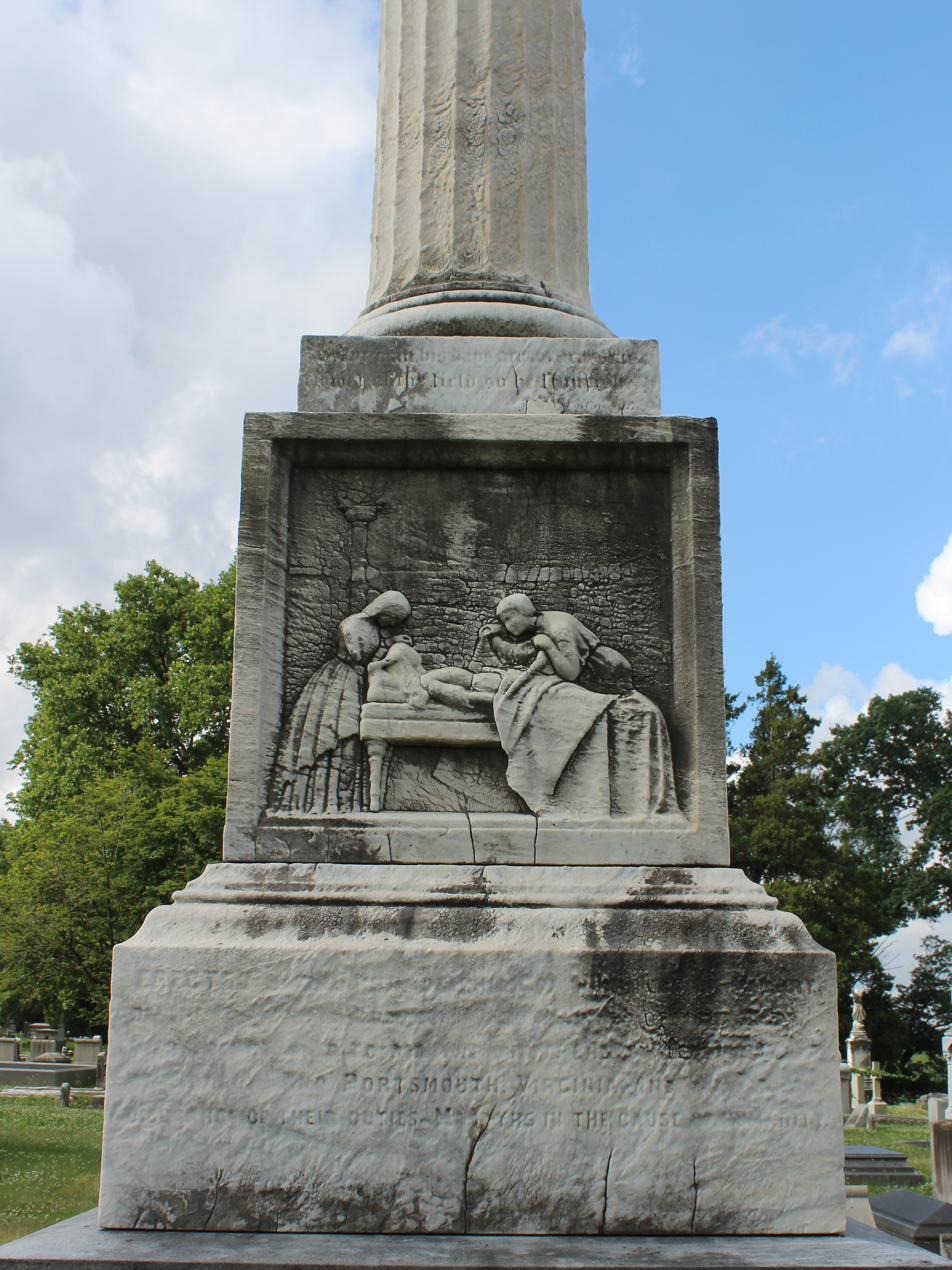
Yellow Fever Memorial in Laurel Hill Cemetery.

=== Challenges & decline ===
The 1793 Philadelphia yellow fever epidemic did impact the academy, postponing fall examinations until the following spring. The epidemic did take the lives of some who worked at the academy, in which administrators and students of the academy would hold a memorial service for. The last year that the Young Ladies' Academy would be listed was 1804, and it is not known why the academy closed down. The increase of similar academies in the area and lack of funding may have contributed to its decline.
