= Elizabeth Female Academy =

- Elizabeth Female Academy Site (No. 101-3X)
- U.S. National Register of Historic Places
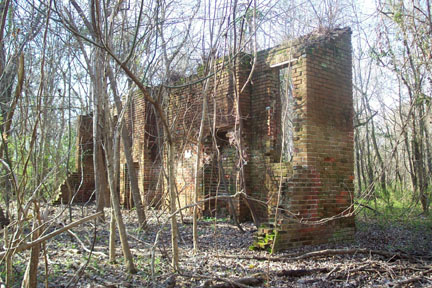
- The ruins

- Location within Mississippi Location within the United States
- Nearest city: Natchez, Mississippi
- Coordinates: 31°34′28.9″N 91°17′38.1″W
- Area: 1.5 acres (0.61 ha)
- Built: 1818
- NRHP reference No.: 77000109
- Added to NRHP: May 6, 1977

The Elizabeth Female Academy, founded in 1818 in the town of Washington, was the first female educational institution in Mississippi. It was named after Mrs. Elizabeth Roach (later Greenfield), who donated the land on which the school was located.

== History ==
The academy received its charter from the State Assembly on February 17, 1819. The school building was said to be "Borrowing a style of architecture from the Spanish of colonial times, the structure was two and a half stories high, the first of brick, the others of frame." The school was operated by Methodists, spiritual culture was emphasized over training for a profession. The curriculum included chemistry, biology, natural and moral philosophy, botany and Latin, among other subjects. John James Audubon taught drawing there in May and June 1822. According to a history of Methodism in Mississippi, "The coming of Mrs. Caroline M. Thayer, in the fall of 1825, was an epoch in the history of the Academy, and her administration marked an era. She was a remarkably accomplished woman, with a genius for administration."

According to the Mississippi Historical Society's Heritage of Mississippi series:

Exceptional in the South at the time, the school operated for over a quarter of a century with an average enrollment of about thirty students. Its ambitious curriculum included literature, Latin, French, English, geography, astronomy, arithmetic, grammar, composition, geography, and moral and natural philosophy. With a nod toward women's role as homemakers, girls were taught 'such parts of chemistry as are applicable to domestic and culinary purpose'...Students began their school day at sunrise, and it concluded with an evening prayer at 8:00 p.m.

The school closed in 1845, due in part to the relocation of the state capital from Natchez to Jackson, the general shift in the center of population, and several epidemics of yellow fever in the area. The Methodists also funded a Vicksburg Female Academy and a Woodville Female Academy. The Vicksburg school seemingly closed before the Elizabeth location. The Elizabeth site was reduced to ruins by a fire around 1879. Part of a brick wall is all that now remains of the Academy buildings.

The site of the Academy was entered on the National Register of Historic Places in 1977. A parking area with interpretive signs and a path to the ruins is located at mile marker 4.1 on the Natchez Trace Parkway.

== Notable faculty and alumnae ==
- Varina Howell Davis

== See also ==
- Jefferson College
