= Bethlehem Female Seminary =

Coordinates: 40.630°N 75.380°W

The Bethlehem Female Seminary was established in 1742 in Germantown, Philadelphia and was the first Protestant boarding school for girls in what became the United States. The Bethlehem Female Seminary later became known as the Moravian Female Seminary, and in 1863 the seminary was established as Moravian College.

== History ==
The institution can trace its roots back to its founder Countess Benigna Zinzendorf, who established the seminary in 1742. It moved to Bethlehem, Pennsylvania, in 1745. The seminary began as an elementary educational institution for young girls starting at ages five or six years old. In 1785, due to increasing demand, the Bethlehem Female Seminary reorganized as a secondary educational institution that became known as the Moravian Female Seminary. The newly reorganized female seminary also became open to all denominations.

From its first opening, the seminary admitted girls starting at age five or six for elementary education. After 1785, the seminary became a secondary educational institution that admitted girls between the ages of eight and fifteen. The seminary student body included girls from New England, Maryland, South Carolina, Nova Scotia, and the West Indies. By the nineteenth century, its student population consisted of more than seven thousand.

In the late eighteenth century, tuition costs were £20 in Pennsylvania currency per year, which covered the common schooling cost, including reading, writing, arithmetic, geometry, and sewing. Specialized subjects such as needlework, music, and drawing required an extra two guineas per subject. Clothing, medicine, books, and other classroom supplies were designated separate charges to be paid quarterly. Room and board amounted to twenty shillings per year.

The Bethlehem Female Seminary was founded under the Moravian Church and focuses teachings on the faith and cultivating the mind.

== Academics ==
The Bethlehem Female Seminary encouraged a wide range of useful training for girls. Since its establishment in the eighteenth century, the seminary maintained the belief that "when you educate a woman, you educate an entire family." This modern attitude toward women's education was reflected in their curriculum, which was based on liberal and household teachings.

The early curriculum at Bethlehem Female Seminary included reading, writing, arithmetic, grammar, geography, history, astronomy, music, German, and English. The seminary also focused on teaching household duties such as sewing and needlework. When the Bethlehem Female Seminary became the Moravian Female Seminary in 1785, it restructured its curriculum into five categories. These subjects were spiritual and moral guidance, intellectual and cultural pursuits, vocational training, social cultivation, and physical exercise.

== Affiliations ==
The Bethlehem Female Seminary was the foundation for various educational institutions based on the ideals of the Moravian Church. The seminary was also affiliated with a Moravian boy's boarding school at Nazareth Hall.

== See also ==
- Female seminary
- Women's education in the United States
- List of coordinate colleges
