= Green River Female Academy =

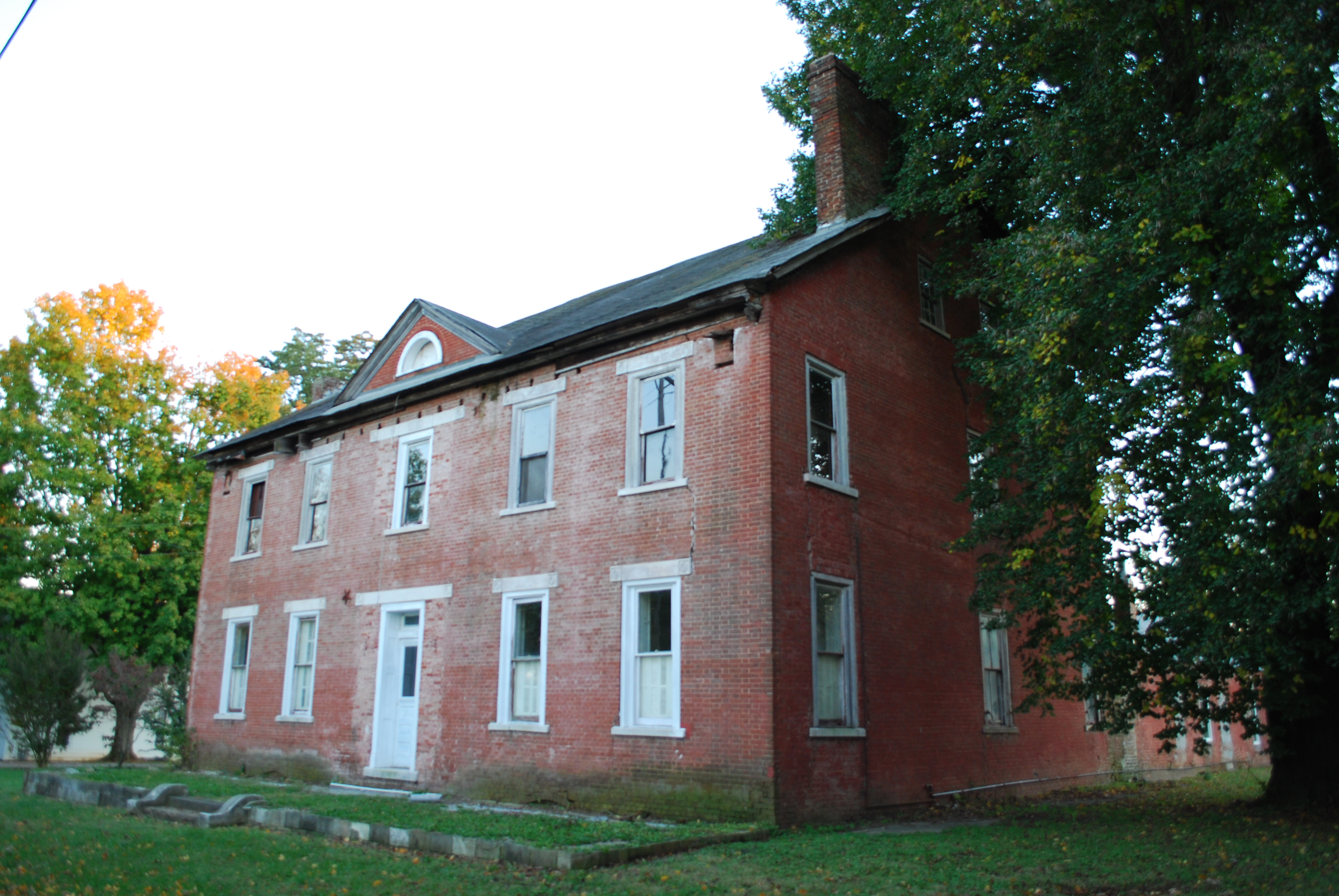

- Location within Kentucky
- Location: 204 Goebel Avenue, Elkton, Kentucky
- Coordinates: 36°48′21″N 87°9′9″W
- Built: 1835
- Architect: D. V. Robinson
- Architectural style: Federal-Greek Revival Transitional
- Added to NRHP: December 06, 1990

The Green River Female Academy in Todd County, Kentucky is one of the best indications of early 19th century attitudes towards educational equality in the United States and is an example of early Kentucky Georgian, Federal and Greek Revival transitional architecture.

== Overview ==
The school was built for the stockholders and trustees of the Green River Female Academy, begun in 1835 and completed in 1836 by a team of masons, carpenters, journeymen, and turners. The five-bay double pile building stands on a 1.5-acre (0.61 ha) lot in the city of Elkton. The Green River Female Academy is the only school predating the Civil War in the Green River region, broadly defined, to survive.

== Architecture ==
The building was programmed by David V. Robinson and constructed by Jesse Russell and Daniel Grumbly. The building is rendered primarily in both the Federal and Greek-Revival styles, but retains elements of the Georgian period that architectural historian Clay Lancaster noted as "Georgian Survival." The exterior of the building is designed primarily in the Federal style which is accomplished by the emphasis that has been placed upon the central bay of the symmetrically aligned building. The building displays no brick belt course that would be characteristic of the previous Georgian style, nor does it utilize the temple form of the later Greek Revival period. The pedimented gable over the central bay is a distinct characteristic of the Georgian period of architecture. The building's carved limestone lintels above its facade windows and door feature circular bosses on both ends which are characteristic of the Greek Revival period. The interior radiates from a central hallway that traverses three floors. The plan is nearly symmetrical on all floors. Robinson, Russell and Grumbly possibly used the pattern books of Asher Benjamin and Owen Biddle Jr. to create a plan and details for the academy building, as many of the details align in form with the designs featured in Benjamin and Biddle's pattern books.

== School ==
Stock for the project was sold to fund the construction of the academy. The school grew to become very prominent in the 19th century. Kentucky, along with North Carolina, boasted the best schools in the nation. During the early to mid-nineteenth century, Academy principal Lucinda Hannah Dickey disregarded social convention by teaching enslaved servants to read and to write, an effort which was considered to be socially unacceptable during the time period. The school remained an all female academy until 1853 when the Academy admitted young men. Many graduates of the Academy attended colleges in the northeast including Yale and Columbia. Notable figures including United States Supreme Court Justice James Clark McReynolds attended the school, excelling in academics under United States Naval Academy Graduate Major Samuel Robert Crumbaugh. The school held its prestige until the late 1880s. Elkton became a state center of education in the late 19th century after the introduction of various colleges, seminaries and academies, including the Vanderbilt Training School and Bethel College. After these schools were introduced to the area, attendance at the Green River Academy began to fall. After the school became defunct, the stock was sold in majority to the City of Elkton Trustees and was used as a public school for the community of Elkton. The school remained in operation until the stock was dissolved and the building was thereafter converted into a residence by the Judge Walton Forgy.

== Restoration ==
The Green River Academy Preservation Society controls the estate. The Green River Academy Preservation Society was awarded a grant $500,000 in the spring of 2011 by Governor Steve Beshear to restore the building.
