= Female seminary =

Private educational institution for women

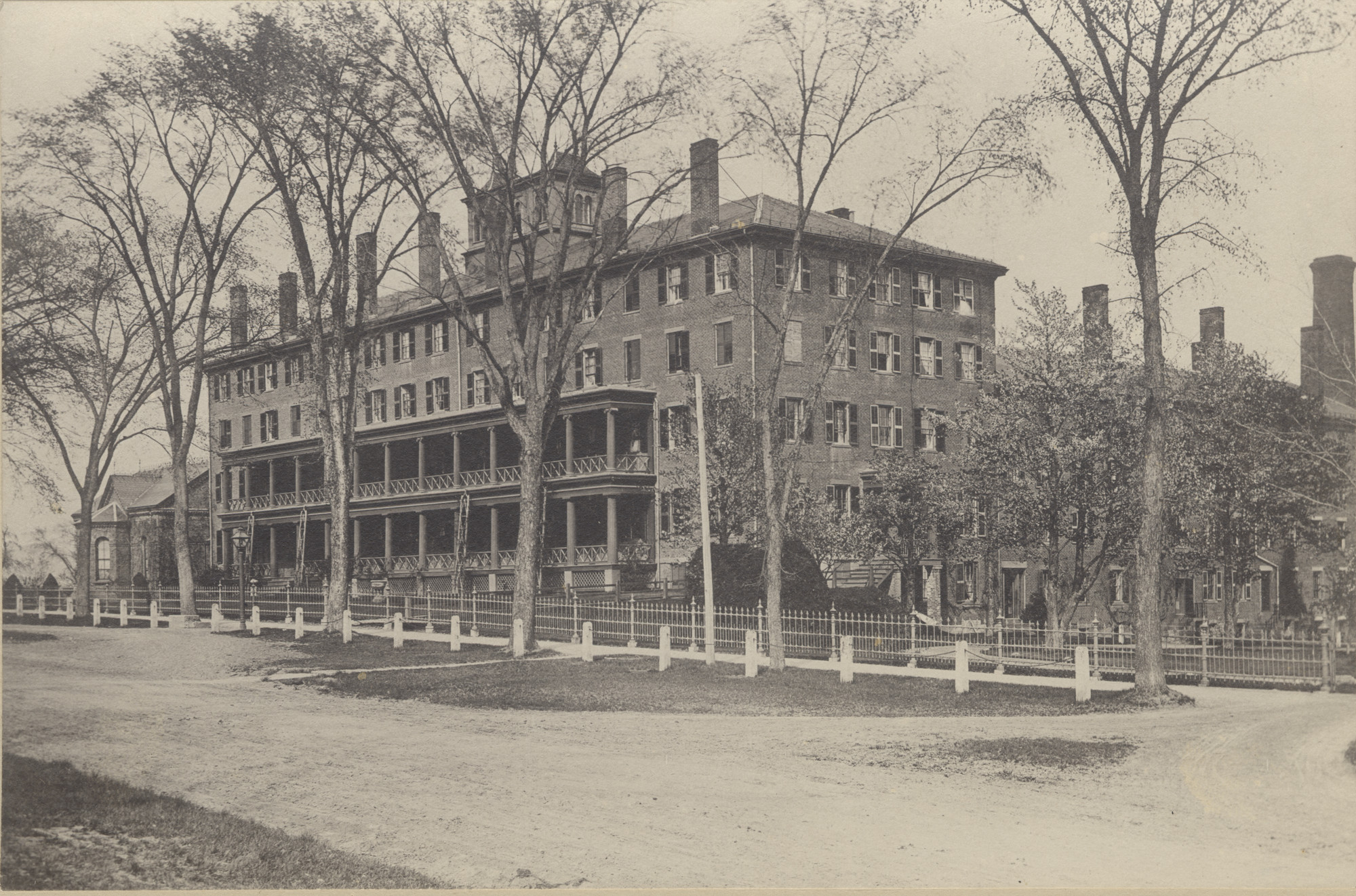
Mount Holyoke Female Seminary.

A female seminary is a private educational institution for women, popular especially in the United States in the nineteenth and early twentieth centuries, when opportunities in educational institutions for women were scarce. The movement was a significant part of a remarkable transformation in American education in the period 1820–1850. Supporting academic education for women, the seminaries were part of a large and growing trend toward women's equality. Some trace its roots to 1815, and characterize it as at the confluence of various liberation movements. Some of the seminaries gradually developed as four-year colleges.

== History ==
The Bethlehem Female Seminary was founded in 1742 in Germantown, Pennsylvania. Established as a seminary for girls, it eventually became the Moravian Seminary and College for Women and later merged with nearby schools to become the coeducational Moravian College. The Girls' School of the Single Sister's House was founded in 1772 in what is now Winston-Salem, North Carolina. Originally established as a primary school, it later became an academy (high school) and finally a college. Now known as Salem College, it is the oldest female educational establishment that is still a women's college and the oldest female institution in the Southern United States.

Female seminaries were a cultural phenomenon across the United States in the mid-nineteenth century. They succeeded the boarding school, which had offered a more family-like atmosphere. In contrast, seminaries were often larger institutions run by more professional teachers, equivalent to men's colleges. Such parity between men's and women's education had been demanded by notable educators and women's rights activists such as Emma Willard and Catharine Beecher. Willard founded the Troy Female Seminary in 1821, which is hailed as the first institute in the US for women's higher education. Beecher (the sister of Harriet Beecher Stowe) founded the Hartford Female Seminary in 1823, promoted female education and teaching in the American West in the 1830s, and in 1851 started the American Women's Educational Association. Much was at stake in women's education, which was reflected in the very name "seminary":

In the early nineteenth century the word seminary began to replace the word academy. The new word connoted a certain seriousness. The seminary saw its task primarily as professional preparation. The male seminary prepared men for the ministry; the female seminary took as its earnest job the training of women for teaching and for Republican motherhood.

Of 6085 seminaries and academies operating in the United States in the period circa 1850, fully half were devoted to women, many of them started by Evangelical Christians. The female seminary movement helped foster a huge growth in female literacy; the rate went from being half that of males to matching it.

Some seminaries were converted to coeducational institutions. For example, the Green River Female Academy in Todd County, Kentucky admitted men and changed its name. It is now known as the University of the Cumberlands.

== Regional developments ==
In New England towns, female seminaries were a vital and influential force in the "training of New England women between 1815 and 1840... they were scattered throughout the region." Such seminaries offered advanced training for daughters of farmers and professionals. While sentimental values were core, emotional piety and religious revival were key features. They served to propagate and disseminate sexual stereotypes and gender roles. Discipline was a main goal, not student liberation or a "broadening of their limited horizons". The seminaries managed to inculcate manners, decorum, discipline, and domesticity. While they may not have been a force for freeing women, "many teachers, some missionaries, many ministers' wives, and numerous other useful citizens" were counted among alumnae. New England seminaries propagated numerous direct descendants including Lake Erie and Mills Colleges.

Southern iterations were among the country's most advanced, offering the equivalent of four-year college programs before the Civil War. In the South, there was "an unprecedented social experiment in women's education". Southern female seminaries educated daughters, and "education in a renowned and fashionable seminary conferred social capital as well as intellectual and artistic satisfaction". Trends throughout the United States included expanding facilities in a more institutional format, with more academic classes. Classical building structures became a norm, in sharp contrast to earlier forms of female education. By midcentury, "female seminaries and academies were everywhere, replacing the homelike atmosphere of boarding schools with a more institutional setting". Within were housed chapels, classrooms, dining halls, and dormitories.

Female seminaries began to emerge in the Midwest in the 1830s. The movement was heavily informed by the female seminary movement in New England, from which it drew many of its teachers. In states that had not yet instituted free public secondary schools, both female and coeducational seminaries often emerged as private solutions to this need. Many of these institutions received state aid, and many subsequently merged into the local public school districts. A few, such as the Mount Carroll Seminary (which later became Shimer College), avoided this fate and continued as independent women's institutions.

== See also ==
- Rossander Course
- Female education in the United States
- List of current and historical women's universities and colleges in the United States
- Normal school
- Women's colleges in the United States
- Midrasha - an educational institution in Orthodox Judaism widely referred to as a "seminary"

== Works cited ==
- Woody, Thomas (1929). Women's Education in the United States (1966 reprint ed.). Octagon Books.
- Belting, Paul (1919). The Development of the Free Public High School in Illinois to 1860. Illinois State Historical Society.
