= List of women's universities and colleges in the United States =

The following is a list of current and historical women's colleges in the United States, organized by state. These are institutions of higher education in the United States that have student populations composed exclusively or almost exclusively of women. There are approximately thirty active women's colleges in the U.S., most of which are liberal arts colleges.

The entire list is organized by state location and, then, in alphabetical order. Active women's colleges are listed in bold text. Former women's colleges that are now coeducational are listed in plain text.

== Alabama ==
Name	Image	Dates of operation	Dates of women-only	City	Notes
Alabama Central Female College		1857–1923	1857–1923	Tuscaloosa	The main building burned down in 1923 and became a park in the 1930s.
Alabama Conference Female College (now Huntingdon College)		1854–	1854–1934	Tuskegee	Tuskegee Female College (1854–1872), Alabama Conference Female College (1872–1910), Woman's College of Alabama (1910–1935); from 1854 to 1909, the college was in Tuskegee, Alabama, and later moved to Montgomery, Alabama
Alabama Female Institute		1830–1888	1830–1888	Tuscaloosa	Previously known as Sims' Academy and Tuscaloosa Female Academy.
Alabama Girls' Industrial School			1896–1969	Montevallo	Since 1969, known as University of Montevallo.
Athens Female Academy		1830–1888	1822–1931	Athens	later renamed Athens State University.
Auburn (Masonic) Female College			1852–1870	Auburn	
Auburn Female Institute			1892–1908	Auburn	
Barber Memorial College		1896–1916	1896–1916	Anniston	Merged with Scotia Women's College in 1916 to create Barber–Scotia Junior College for women in Concord, North Carolina.
Florence Synodical Female College		1854–1896	1854–1896	Florence	
Huntsville Female College		1851–1895	1851–1895	Huntsville	
Judson College		1838–2021	1838–2021	Marion	
Livingston Female Academy			1835–1915	Livingston	Now the University of West Alabama

== Arkansas ==
Name	Image	Dates of operation	Dates of women-only	City	Notes
Crescent College and Conservatory		1908–1934	1908–1934	Eureka Springs	
Galloway Female College		1889–1933	1889–1933	Searcy	Merged with Hendrix College

== California ==
Name	Image	Dates of operation	Dates of women-only	City	Notes
Dominican University of California			1890–1971	San Rafael	
Holy Names University		1868–2023	1868–1971	Oakland	
Los Angeles Pacific College		1911–1965	1911–1960	East Los Angeles	
Marymount College of Los Angeles		1923–1973	1923–1973	Los Angeles	One of the Marymount colleges, merged to create Loyola Marymount University in 1973.
Mills College		1852–2022	1852–1920; 1990–2022	Oakland	Merged with Northeastern University in 2022 to form Mills College at Northeastern University.
Mount St. Mary's University			1925–1960	Los Angeles	
Napa Ladies' Seminary			?–1880	Napa	
Notre Dame de Namur University			1851–1967	Belmont	Co-ed since 1967, graduate school-only since 2021.
Pitzer College			1963–1970	Claremont	
Presentation College			?–1971	Los Gatos	An affiliate of the University of San Francisco.
St. Joseph College		1953–1973	1953–1973	Orange	Merged to create Loyola Marymount University.
San Diego College for Women		1950–1972	1950–1972	San Diego	Merged in 1972 to create the University of San Diego.
San Francisco College for Women			1930s–1969	San Francisco	The college became co-ed in 1969 under the name of Lone Mountain College, merged in 1978 into the University of San Francisco.
**Scripps College**	(view as a 360° interactive panorama)	1926–present	1926–present	Claremont	

== Colorado ==
Name	Image	Dates of operation	Dates of women-only	City	Notes
Colorado Women's College		1909–1982	1909–1982	Denver	assets merged into the University of Denver.
Colorado Women's College Collaboratory		1888–1982	1888–1982	Denver	Merged with the University of Denver to form The Weekend College
Loretto Heights College		1886–1988	1886–1988	Denver	assets were merged into the Regis University.

== Connecticut ==
Name	Image	Dates of operation	Dates of women-only	City	Notes
Albertus Magnus College			1925–1985	New Haven	
Annhurst College		1941–1980	1941–1972	South Woodstock	
Connecticut College		1911–to present	1911–1969	New London	Thames College (1911), Connecticut College for Women (1911–1969)
Diocesan Sisters College		1949–1969	1949–1969	Bloomfield	
Hartford College for Women		1933–2003	1933–1991	Hartford	Merged into the University of Hartford in 1991
Hartford Female Seminary		1823–late 19th century	1823–late 19th century	Hartford	
Litchfield Female Academy		1792–1863	1792–1833	Litchfield	
Maplewood Music Seminary			1863–?	East Haddam	
Mount Sacred Heart College		1946–1997	1946–1997	Hamden	
University of Saint Joseph		1932–to date	1932–2018	West Hartford	

== District of Columbia ==
Name	Image	Dates of operation	Dates of women-only	City	Notes
Fairmont Junior College		1899–1942	1899–1942	Washington, D.C.	
Dunbarton College of the Holy Cross		1935–1973	1935–1973	Washington, D.C.	
Mount Vernon College for Women		1875–1999	1875–1997	Georgetown	now part of George Washington University
**Trinity Washington University**		1897–to present	1897–present	Washington, D.C.	Primary undergraduate college remains women-only; it was named Trinity College from 1897 until 2004.
Washington College of Law at American University		1896–to present	1896–1897	Tenleytown	

== Florida ==
Name	Image	Dates of operation	Dates of women-only	City	Notes
Barry University		1940–to present	1940–1975	Miami Shores	
Bethune-Cookman University		1904–to present	1904–1927	Daytona Beach	Daytona Normal and Industrial Institute for Girls (1904–1927); merged to form the Daytona Cookman Collegiate Institute
Florida State College for Women (now Florida State University)		1851–to present	1905–1947	Tallahassee	Founded as a co-ed "Seminary West of the Suwanee" in 1851, it became "Florida State College for Women" in from 1905 to 1947
Lynn University		1962–to present	1962–1971	Boca Raton	Founded as Marymount College
Saint Joseph College of Florida		1890–1972	1890–1966	Jensen Beach	

== Georgia ==
Name	Image	Dates of operation	Dates of women-only	City	Notes
**Agnes Scott College**		1889–present	1889–present	Decatur	
Americus Female College		?–1879	?–1879	Americus	Also known as Furlow Female College
Andrew College		1854–to present	1854–1956	Cuthbert	
Bethel Female College		?–1875	?–1875	Cuthbert	
Brenau University		1878–to present	1878–1960s	Gainesville	
Chappell College for Women				Columbus	Also known as Chappell's College, it succeeded Columbus Female College after it burned down in 1884. Joseph Harris Chappell served as its president.
Cox College		1842–1934	1842–1934	LaGrange	Later located in College Park
Georgia College & State University		1889–to present	1889–1967	Milledgeville	
Griffin Female College		1848–188?	1848–188?	Griffin	Its building was converted to a private residence in 1889
Hamilton Female College		?–1870	?–1870	Hamilton	
Houston Female College		?–1896	?–1896	Perry	
LaGrange College		1831–to present	1831–1953	LaGrange	
Madison Collegiate Institute and Methodist Female College		?–1880	?–1880	Madison	
Monroe Female Seminary		1829–?	1829–?		
Shorter University			1873–1953	Rome	
Sparta Female Seminary		1829–?	1829–?		
**Spelman College**		1881–present	1881–present	Atlanta	Atlanta Baptist Female Seminary (1881–1884)
Talbotton Female Seminary		1829–?	1829–?		
The Female College			1833–1889	Covington	
Tift College		1849–1986	1849–1986	Forsyth	Merged with Mercer University in 1986, then closed by Mercer in 1987.
Valdosta State University		1913–to present	1913–1950	Valdosta	South Georgia State Normal College (1913–1922); Georgia State Woman's College (1922–1950)
**Wesleyan College**		1836–present	1836–present	Macon	The first women's college in the U.S.

== Illinois ==
Name	Image	Dates of operation	Dates of women-only	City	Notes
Aurora University		1893–to present	1893–1960	Aurora	Originally named Mendota College
Barat College of the Sacred Heart		1858–2005	1858–1973	Lake Forest	The college was purchased by DePaul University in 2001
Dominican University		1848–to present	1848–1970	River Forest	Formed as St. Clara Female Academy in 1848; St. Clara College (1901–1922), Rosary College (1922–1997)
Evanston College for Ladies		1871–1873	1871–1873	Evanston	Merged with Northwestern University
Lexington College		1977–2014	1977–2014	Chicago	
MacMurray College		1846–2020	1846–1969	Jacksonville	
Monticello College		1838–1971	1838–1971	Godfrey	
Mundelein College			1930–1968	Chicago	Co-ed in 1968, merged with Loyola University Chicago in 1991.
North-Western Female College			1855–1873		Merged with Evanston College for Ladies and Northwestern University in 1873.
Rockford University			1847–1958	Rockford	Founded as Rockford Female Seminary in 1847; became co-ed in 1958; Rockford College from 1892–2013.
Saint Xavier University			?–1969	Chicago	Co-ed since 1969.
Shimer College		1853–2017	1853–1950	Chicago	acquired by North Central College
University of St. Francis		1920–to present	1920–1971	Joliet	Opened as the Sisters' Normal Institute of Higher Learning

== Indiana ==
Name	Image	Dates of operation	Dates of women-only	City	Notes
Coates College for Women			1885–1897	Terre Haute	Closed in 1897.
Long College for Women			1947–1978	Hanover	Closed by Hanover College in 1978.
Marian University			?–1954	Indianapolis	Co-ed since 1954; named Marian College until 2009.
Moravian Seminary for Young Ladies			1866–1881	Hope	
**Saint Mary's College**			1844–present	Notre Dame	
Saint Mary-of-the-Woods College			1840–2015	St. Mary's	Co-ed since 2015
University of Saint Francis			?–1957	Fort Wayne	Co-ed since 1957

== Iowa ==
Name	Image	Dates of operation	Dates of women-only	City	Notes
Briar Cliff University			1930–1966	Sioux City	Co-ed since 1966
Clarke University			?–1979	Dubuque	co-ed since 1979; was named Clarke College until 2010.
Decorah College for Women			c. 1932–1936	Decorah	Merged with Luther College in 1936.
Marycrest International University			1939–1969	Davenport	Co-ed in 1969, closed in 2002.
Mount Mercy University			1928–1969	Cedar Rapids	Co-ed since 1969; named Mount Mercy College until 2010.
Ottumwa Heights College			1864–1967	Ottumwa	Co-ed in 1967; closed in 1980.

== Kansas ==
Name	Image	Dates of operation	Dates of women-only	City	Notes
Newman University			1933–1965	Wichita	Co-ed since 1965
Mount St. Scholastica College			1858–1917	Atchison	Merged in 1971 with all-male St. Benedict's College to form Benedictine College.
Oswego College for Young Ladies			?–1910	Oswego	Closed in 1910.
University of Saint Mary			?–1988	Leavenworth	Co-ed since 1988; named Saint Mary College until 2003.
Vail College			?–1928	Topeka	Closed in 1928; also known as College of the Sisters of Bethany.

== Kentucky ==
Name	Image	Dates of operation	Dates of women-only	City	Notes
Beaumont College			?–1917		Closed in 1917
Bethel College			?–1951	Russellville	Co-ed in 1951; closed in 1964.
Brescia University			1925–1950	Owensboro	Established a co-ed Owensboro branch in 1925; became fully co-ed in 1950 when the branches merged.
Caldwell Female College			1854–1913	Danville	Originally the Henderson Female Institute in 1854; in 1913, it consolidated with the Princeton Collegiate Institute and became the Kentucky College for Women.
Campbell–Hagerman College			1903–1912	Lexington	Founded in 1903; closed in 1912.
Cedar Bluff College			?–1892	Woodburn	Closed in 1892
Clinton College			?–1876	Clinton	Co-ed in 1876; closed in 1915.
Elizabethtown Female Academy			1848–?	Elizabethtown	Incorporated in 1848, It grew out of the boys-only Hardin Academy, established in 1806.
Georgetown Female College			?–1893	Georgetown	Merged with Georgetown College in 1893.
Green River Academy			1834–?		Founded by the Cumberland Presbytery, now a museum.
Hamilton College			1869–1903	Lexington	Founded in 1869 as Hocker Female College affiliated with the Disciples of Christ. In 1889, Kentucky University (later Transylvania University) bought a stake in the school, taking total control in 1903, and closed in 1932.
John Lyle's Female Seminary			1806–?		Founded in 1806.
Kentucky College for Young Ladies			1874–1896	Pewee Valley	Opened in 1874, became a co-ed day school in 1896, and was destroyed by fire at the end of the century.
Kentucky College for Women			?–1926	Danville	Formerly Caldwell Female College, merged with Centre College in 1926.
Lexington Female College			?–?	Lexington	
Logan College			1856–1931	Russellville	Also known as Russellville Collegiate Institute and Logan Female College.
Lynnland Female Institute			1867–1870s 1888–1915	Glendale	Also known as Lynnland Female College, co-ed in the 1870s as the Lynnland Military Institution, then briefly closed. Re-opened in 1888 as the same women's college, and closed in 1915. Currently the site of an orphanage.
Midway University			1847–2016	Midway	Co-ed since 2016
Millersburg Female College			1837–1850s 1860–1915	Georgetown	Founded as Female Collegiate Institute, affiliated with the Disciples of Christ. Through the 1850s, it was co-ed. In February 1860, the state granted a charter to the Millersburg Female College, and in June 1867 it graduated its first class of four women. In 1915, it was renamed Millersburg College, and in 1931 the nearby Millersburg Military Institute purchased it to be an elementary school for its junior cadets. A college and a normal department were established in 1862.
Nazareth Academy			1814–?	Nelson County	Founded by the Catholic Sisters of Charity of Nazareth, moved from its original site outside of Bardstown to Nazareth in 1822. Granted degrees in 1829 and was later designated as a college.
Owensboro Female College			1890–1931	Owensboro	Opened in fall 1890, chartered on March 26, 1893. By 1931, the building was taken over by the Owensboro Trade School, and in 1939 the building was demolished in favor of a new building.
Pleasant J. Potter College			?–1909	Bowling Green	Closed in 1909.
Sayre Female Institute			1854–1876	Lexington	Founded as Transylvania Female Seminary, able to confer degrees starting in 1856.
Spalding College			1920–1973	Louisville	Founded by the Sisters of Charity of Nazareth as the Louisville campus of Nazareth College, it became co-ed in 1973.
St. Catharine College			1931–1951	Springfield	Co-ed in 1951; closed in 2016.
Stanford Female College			?–1907	Stanford	Closed in 1907.
Ursuline College			?–1968	Louisville	Merged into Bellarmine College in 1968.
Villa Madonna College			1921–1945	Covington	Founded by the Benedictine Sisters of Covington, it became co-ed in 1945 and has an affiliation with the all-male St. Thomas More College (now Thomas More University).

== Louisiana ==
Name	Image	Dates of operation	Dates of women-only	City	Notes
College of the Sacred Heart			1922–1956	Grand Coteau	Closed in 1956.
Dodd College			1927–1942	Shreveport	
H. Sophie Newcomb Memorial College			1886–c. 1945	New Orleans	Hosted co-ed classes after the 1940s, merged with Tulane University, and closed in 2006.
Keachi Female College			?–1912	Keachi	Closed in 1912.
Mansfield Female College			?–1930	Mansfield	Merged with Centenary College of Louisiana in 1930.
University of Holy Cross			?–1967	New Orleans	Co-ed since 1967; was named Our Lady of Holy Cross College until 2016.
St. Mary's Dominican College			?–1984	New Orleans	Closed in 1984.

== Maine ==
Name	Image	Dates of operation	Dates of women-only	City	Notes
Saint Joseph's College of Maine			1912–1970	Standish	Co-ed since 1970

== Maryland ==
Name	Image	Dates of operation	Dates of women-only	City	Notes
Baltimore Female College		1849–1890	1849–1890	Baltimore	
Cambridge Female Academy		1830–?	1830–?		
Chevy Chase Junior College			1903–1950	Chevy Chase	
Goucher College			1910–1986	Towson	Formerly the Women's College of Baltimore, it has been co-ed since 1986.
Hood College		1893	1893–2002	Frederick	Previously the Woman's College of Frederick
Lutherville Female Seminary			1853–1952	Lutherville	Later renamed Maryland College for Women.
Mount Saint Agnes College		1890–1971	1890–1971	Mount Washington, Baltimore	Closed in 1971; then merged with all-male Loyola College, now part of co-ed Loyola University Maryland.
Mount Washington Female College		1856–1861	1856–1861	Mount Washington, Baltimore	Affiliated with the Lutheran Church, closed during the Civil War.
St. Mary's Female Seminary Junior College			?–1949	St. Mary's City	Became co-ed in 1949; the name changed in 1949 to St. Mary's Seminary, became a four-year college in 1966, and the name was changed to St. Mary's College of Maryland, and is now associated with the state system of public state colleges (University System of Maryland).
Notre Dame of Maryland University			1896–2023	Baltimore	Became a college in 1896, College of Notre Dame of Maryland until 2011, and has been co-ed since 2023.
Patapsco Female Institute		1837–1891	1837–1891	Ellicott City	
Saint Joseph College			?–1973	Emmitsburg	Merged in 1973 with then-all-male Mount Saint Mary's University, which is now co-ed.
Villa Julie College			?–1972	Stevenson	Has been co-ed since 1972; name changed to Stevenson University in 2008.
Woman's Medical College of Baltimore			1882–1910	Baltimore	

== Massachusetts ==
Name	Image	Dates of operation	Dates of women-only	City	Notes
Anna Maria College		1946–2026	1946–1973	Paxton	
Aquinas College		1956–2000	1956–2000	Milton and Newton	
Bard College at Simon's Rock			1964–1970	Great Barrington	Co-ed since 1970; campus was moved to New York State in 2025.
**Bay Path University**		1897–present	1897–present	Longmeadow	
Bradford College		1803–2000	1803–1971	Haverhill	
Cardinal Cushing College		1952–1972	1952–1972	Brookline	
Elms College		1928–to present	1928–1998	Chicopee	
Emmanuel College		1919–to present	1919–2001	Boston	
Endicott College		1939–to present	1939–1994	Beverly	
Garland Junior College			1872–1976	Boston	Merged into Simmons College in 1976.
Ipswich Female Seminary		1828–1878	1828–1878	Ipswich	
Jackson College for Women				Medford	A coordinate college of Tufts University; merged with Tufts School of Arts & Sciences in 1980.
Lasell University		1851–to present	1851–1997	Newton	named Lasell College until 2019.
Lesley College			1909–2005	Cambridge	A college of Lesley University; co-ed since 2005.
**Mount Holyoke College**			1837–present	South Hadley	
Mount Ida College			1899–1972	Newton	Has been co-ed since 1972; was closed in 2018 and acquired by University of Massachusetts at Amherst as Mount Ida Campus of UMass Amherst.
New England Female Medical College				Boston	Merged into the Boston University School of Medicine in 1874.
New England School of Law			1908–1930	Boston	Co-ed since 1930
Newton College of the Sacred Heart			1946–1974	Newton Centre	Merged with Boston College in 1974.
Oread Institute			1946–1934	Worcester	Closed in 1934.
Pine Manor College			1911–2014	Chestnut Hill	Has been co-ed since 2014; incorporated in 2020 into Boston College's Messina College.
Radcliffe College			1879–1999	Cambridge	Closed in 1999, now an institute within Harvard University.
Regis College			1927–2007	Weston	Co-ed since 2007
**Simmons University**			1899–present	Boston	Simmons has online programs and graduate school open to co-eds, the daytime undergraduate program remains women-only.
**Smith College**			1871–present	Northampton	
**Wellesley College**			1870–present	Wellesley	
Wheaton College			1834–1987	Norton	Co-ed since 1987
Wheelock College			1888–1967	Boston	Became co-ed in 1967; merged with Boston University in 2018.

== Michigan ==
Name	Image	Dates of operation	Dates of women-only	City	Notes
Aquinas College			1886–1931	Grand Rapids	Co-ed since 1931
Madonna University			1937–1972	Livonia	Co-ed since 1972
Marygrove College			1905–1970	Detroit	Co-ed since 1970, closed in 2019.
Mercy College of Detroit				Detroit	Co-ed date unknown; merged to form the University of Detroit Mercy in 1990.
Michigan Female College			1855–1869	Lansing	Began in 1855.
Michigan Female Seminary			1865–?	Kalamazoo	Began in 1865.
Siena Heights University			1919–1969	Adrian	Co-ed since 1969
Young Ladies Seminary and Collegiate Institute				Monroe	

== Minnesota ==
Name	Image	Dates of operation	Dates of women-only	City	Notes
Albert Lea College for Women			1884–1916	Albert Lea	
**College of Saint Benedict**			1955–present	St. Joseph	Founded as a partnership with nearby all-male Saint John's University. Since 1961, the schools have operated with fully co-ed classes; however, the schools remain legally and administratively separate, with separate residential facilities and athletic programs.
College of St. Scholastica			1912–1969	Duluth	Co-ed since 1969
College of Saint Teresa			1907–1989	Winona	Closed in 1989.
**St. Catherine University**			1905–present	Saint Paul	College of St. Catherine until 2009.
Saint Mary's Junior College				Minneapolis	Merged with College of St. Catherine in 1985.

== Mississippi ==
Name	Image	Dates of operation	Dates of women-only	City	Notes
All Saints' College			1908–1971	Vicksburg	Co-ed in 1971; closed in 2006.
Blue Mountain Christian University			1873–2005	Blue Mountain	Co-ed since 2005; named Blue Mountain College until 2022.
Chickasaw Female College			1851–1936	Pontotoc	Closed in 1936.
Corona College			1857–1862	Corinth	Closed in 1862.
Elizabeth Female Academy			1819–1845	Washington	Founded in 1819, closed in 1845.
Hillman College			1853–1942	Clinton	Merged with Mississippi College in 1942.
Mary Holmes College			1892–1932	West Point	A historically black college, became co-ed in 1932; closed in 2003.
Meridian Female College			1865–1904	Meridian	Closed in 1904.
Mississippi University for Women			1884–1982	Columbus	Co-ed since 1982
Mississippi Woman's College			1911–1954	Hattiesburg	Founded in 1892 as Pearl River Boarding School, later became women-only and was named Mississippi Woman's College from 1911 to 1954. Co-ed since 1954; now William Carey University.
Mount Hermon Female Seminary			1875–1924	Clinton	Closed in 1924.
Port Gibson Female College			1843–1908	Port Gibson	Closed in 1908.
Sharon Female College			1837–1873	Sharon	Closed in 1873.
Union Female College			1838–1911	Oxford	Affiliated with Cumberland Presbyterian Church, closed in 1911.
Whitworth Female College			1858–1950	Brookhaven	Co-ed in 1950; closed in 1980.

== Missouri ==
Name	Image	Dates of operation	Dates of women-only	City	Notes
Avila University			1916–1969	Kansas City	Co-ed since 1969
Baird College			1885–1898	Clinton	Closed in 1898.
Carlton College			?–1861	Springfield	Closed in 1861.
Central Female College			1869–1924	Lexington	Closed in 1924.
Clinton College			?–1904	Clinton	Closed in 1904.
**Cottey College**			1884–present	Nevada	
Columbia College			1851–1969	Columbia	Co-ed since 1969; Christian College from 1851–1970.
Forest Park College			?–1925	St. Louis	Closed in 1925.
Hardin College and Conservatory of Music			1858–1931	Mexico	Closed in 1931.
Howard–Payne Junior College			1859–1927	Fayette	Founded as Howard Female College; closed in 1927.
Independence College			?–1898	Independence	Closed in 1898.
Kansas City Ladies College			?–1905	Independence	Closed in 1905.
Lindenwood University			1832–1969	St. Charles	Co-ed since 1969
Madame Perdreville's School for Girls			1818–?		Founded in 1818.
Marillac College			1955–1974	St. Louis	Closed in 1974.
Maryville University			1872–1968	Town and Country	Co-ed since 1968
Notre Dame College			?–1977	St. Louis	Closed in 1977.
Patee Female College			?–1868	St. Joseph	Closed in 1868.
St. Joseph Female College			1875–1881	St. Joseph	Closed in 1881.
St. Louis Female Academy			1823–?	St. Louis	Founded in 1823.
**Stephens College**			1833–present	Columbia	
Synodical College			1873–1928	Fulton	Closed in 1928.
Webster University			1915–1962	Webster Groves	Co-ed since 1962
William Woods University			1870–1997	Fulton	Co-ed since 1997
Woman's Medical College of St. Louis			1883–1884 1891–1896	St. Louis	A women's medical college, opened and closed in two separate periods.

== Nebraska ==
Name	Image	Dates of operation	Dates of women-only	City	Notes
Clarkson College			1888–1970s	Omaha	Co-ed since the 1970s
**College of Saint Mary**			1923–present	Omaha	

== New Hampshire ==
Name	Image	Dates of operation	Dates of women-only	City	Notes
Colby–Sawyer College			1928–1990	New London	A women's college from 1928 to 1990; co-ed since 1991.
Miss Catherine Fiske's Young Ladies Seminary			1814–1840s	Keene	Founded in 1814.
Mount Saint Mary College		1934–1978	1934–1978	Hooksett	
Notre Dame College			1950–1985	Manchester	Became co-ed in 1985; closed in 2002; academic programs merged into Southern New Hampshire University.
Pierce College for Women			?–1972	Concord	Closed in 1972.
Rivier University			1933–1991	Nashua	Co-ed since 1991; called Rivier College until 2012.

== New Jersey ==
Name	Image	Dates of operation	Dates of women-only	City	Notes
**Assumption College for Sisters**			1953–present	Denville	
Bordentown Female College			?–1893	Bordentown	Closed in 1893.
Caldwell University			1939–1985	Caldwell	Co-ed since 1985; named Caldwell College until 2014.
Centenary University			1910–1988	Hackettstown	Founded as a co-ed prep school, it was women-only from 1911 to 1988, then became co-ed again in 1988; named Centenary College until 2016.
St. Elizabeth University			1899–2015	Morristown	Co-ed since 2015; named College of Saint Elizabeth until 2020.
Douglass College			1918–2007	New Brunswick	A residential college since 2007, Douglass College (Rutgers University).
Englewood Cliffs College			1962–1969	Englewood Cliffs	Co-ed in 1969; closed in 1974.
Evelyn College for Women			1887–1897	Princeton	A coordinate women's college of Princeton University, closed in 1897.
Felician University			1923–2015	Lodi and Rutherford	Co-ed since 1986; named Felician College until 2015.
Georgian Court University			1908–2013	Lakewood	Affiliated with the Sisters of Mercy, co-ed since 2013; named Georgian Court College until 2004.

== New York ==
Name	Image	Dates of operation	Dates of women-only	City	Notes
Adelphi University			1912–1946	Garden City	A women's college from 1912 to 1946.
Barleywood Female University			1852–1853	Rochester	Closed in 1853.
**Barnard College**			1889–present	Manhattan	Affiliated with Columbia University.
Bennett College			1890–1978	Millbrook	Closed in 1978.
Briarcliff College			1903–1977	Briarcliff Manor	Closed in 1977.
Cazenovia College			1961–1982	Cazenovia	A women's college from 1961–1982; closed in 2023.
Chamberlain Institute and Female College				Randolph	
College of New Rochelle		1904–2019	1904–2016	New Rochelle	
College of Saint Rose		1920–2024	1920–1969	Albany	
Daemen University			1947–1971	Amherst	Has been co-ed since 1971, and was named Daemen College until 2022.
Dominican University			1952–1967	Orangeburg	Has been co-ed since 1967; named Dominican College until 2022.
D'Youville University			1908–1971	Buffalo	Has been co-ed since 1971; named D'Youville College until 2022.
Elmira College			1855–1969	Elmira	Co-ed since 1969
Finch College			1952–1976	Manhattan	Founded in 1900 as a private secondary school for girls, it became a women's college in 1952 and closed in 1976.
Hunter College			1870–1964	Manhattan	Co-ed since 1964
Ingham University			1835–1892	Le Roy	The first women's college in New York State, closed in 1892.
Keuka College for Women			1921–1985	Keuka Park	Co-ed since 1985
Ladycliff College			1933–1974	Highland Falls	Became co-ed in 1974, closed in 1980.
LIM College			1939–1972	Manhattan	Founded as Laboratory Institute of Merchandising, co-ed since 1972.
Kirkland College			1965–1978	Clinton	Merged with Hamilton College in 1978.
Manhattanville University			1841–1969	Purchase	Has been co-ed since 1969; named Manhattanville College until 2024.
Marymount College			1907–2007	Tarrytown	Merged to become Marymount College of Fordham University, closed by Fordham University in 2007.
Marymount Manhattan College			1936–1970	Manhattan	Co-ed since 1970
Mercy University			1950–1970	Dobbs Ferry	Affiliated with the Sisters of Mercy, co-ed since the 1970s; named Mercy College until 2023.
Molloy University			1955–1982	Rockville Centre	Has been co-ed since 1982; named Molloy College until 2022.
Mount Saint Mary College			1959–1968	Newburgh	Co-ed since 1968
Nazareth University			1924–1973	Pittsford	Has been co-ed since 1973; named Nazareth College until 2023.
New York Medical College for Women			?–1918	Manhattan	Closed in 1918.
Notre Dame College			1933–1971	Staten Island	Founded as an affiliate of Fordham University, merged with St. John's University in 1971.
Russell Sage College			1916–2020	Troy	Has been co-ed since 2020 after it merged with Sage College of Albany.
Rutgers Female College			1838–1894	Manhattan	
Sarah Lawrence College			1926–1968	Yonkers	Co-ed since 1968
Skidmore College			1903–1971	Saratoga Springs	Co-ed since 1971
**Stern College for Women**			1954–present	Manhattan	A college of Yeshiva University.
St. Joseph's University			1916–1970	Brooklyn, New York	Co-ed since 1970; named St. Joseph's College until 2022.
Trocaire College			1958–1972	Buffalo	Affiliated with the Sisters of Mercy, co-ed since 1972.
University of Mount Saint Vincent			1847–1974	Riverdale	Has been co-ed since 1974; named College of Mount Saint Vincent until 2023.
Vassar College			1861–1969	Poughkeepsie	Co-ed since 1969
Villa Maria College			1961–1968	Buffalo	Founded by the Felician Sisters, co-ed since 1968.
Wells College			1868–2005	Aurora	Had been co-ed in 2005; closed in 2024.
**William Smith College for Women**			1908–present	Geneva	A coordinate college of the Hobart and William Smith Colleges.

== North Carolina ==
Name	Image	Dates of operation	Dates of women-only	City	Notes
Asheville Female College			1841–1901	Asheville	
Barber–Scotia College			1867–1954	Concord	Co-ed since 1954
**Bennett College**			1873–present	Greensboro	A historically black college.
Chowan University			1848–1931	Murfreesboro	Co-ed since 1931
Concord Female Seminary				Statesville	
East Carolina University			1907–1909	Greenville	Co-ed since 1909
Flora MacDonald College			1914–1958	Red Springs	Merged in 1958 with all-male Presbyterian Junior College to form St. Andrews University, which closed in 2025.
Greensboro College			1838–1954	Greensboro	Co-ed since 1954
Judson College			1882–?	Hendersonville	Operated 1882–1892; co-ed date unknown.
Lees-McRae College			1900–1927	Banner Elk	Co-ed since 1927
Linwood Female College			1884–1915	near Gastonia	Co-ed in 1915, closed in 1921.
Louisburg Female College			1857–1931	Louisburg	Co-ed since 1931
Mecklenburg Female College				Mecklenburg	
**Meredith College**			1891–present	Raleigh	A private women's liberal arts college and co-ed graduate school.
Montreat College			1945–1959	Montreat	a women's college 1945–1959, now co-ed.
Queens University of Charlotte			1857–1987	Charlotte	Co-ed since 1987; to merge with Elon University in 2026
**Salem College**			1866–present	Winston-Salem	
University of North Carolina at Greensboro			1891–1963	Greensboro	Co-ed since 1963
Wesleyan Female College			?–1893	Murfreesboro	Closed in 1893.
William Peace University			1857–2012	Raleigh	Co-ed since 2012; named Peace College until 2012.

== North Dakota ==
Name	Image	Dates of operation	Dates of women-only	City	Notes
University of Mary			1959–1970	Bismarck	Co-ed since 1970; named Mary College until 1986.

== Ohio ==
Name	Image	Dates of operation	Dates of women-only	City	Notes
Cincinnati Wesleyan Female Seminary			1843–?	Cincinnati	
Edgecliff College			1935–1970	Cincinnati	Co-ed since 1970; merged with Xavier University in 1980.
Hillsboro Female College				Hillsboro	
Lake Erie College			1856–1985	Painesville	Co-ed since 1985
Lourdes University			1958–1975	Sylvania	Co-ed since 1975; named Lourdes College until 2011.
Mount St. Joseph University			1920–1986	Cincinnati	Co-ed since 1986; named College of Mount St. Joseph until 2014.
Notre Dame College			1922–2001	South Euclid	Co-ed in 2001; closed in 2024.
Ohio Dominican University			1911–1964	Columbus	Co-ed since 1964; named Ohio Dominican College until 2002.
Ohio Female College			?–1873	Cincinnati	Closed in 1873.
Ohio Wesleyan Female College			1853–1877	Delaware	Closed in 1877; merged with Ohio Wesleyan University.
Oxford Female Institute			1850–?	Oxford	Merged with Miami University.
Shepardson College for Women			1832–1900	Granville	Merged with Denison University in 1900.
Steubenville Female Seminary			1829–1898	Steubenville	
Ursuline College			1871–1969	Pepper Pike	Co-ed since 1969.
Western College for Women			1853–1974	Oxford	Closed in 1974; merged with Miami University.

== Oklahoma ==
Name	Image	Dates of operation	Dates of women-only	City	Notes
Oklahoma College for Women			1908–1965	Chickasha	Co-ed since 1965; currently named University of Science and Arts of Oklahoma.

== Oregon ==
Name	Image	Dates of operation	Dates of women-only	City	Notes
Marylhurst University		1893–2018	1893–1974	Marylhurst	named St. Mary's College until 1930;
Mount Angel College		?–1972	?–1972	Mount Angel	

== Pennsylvania ==
Name	Image	Dates of operation	Dates of women-only	City	Notes
Alvernia University			1958–1971	Reading	Co-ed since 1971; named Alvernia College until 2008.
Arcadia University			1853–1972	Glenside	Co-ed since 1972; named Beaver Female Seminary from 1853–1872; then renamed Beaver College from 1872–2001.
**Bryn Mawr College**			1885–present	Bryn Mawr	
Cabrini University			1957–1980	Radnor	Co-ed since 1980; named Cabrini College until 2016, closed in 2023.
Carlow University			1929–1945	Pittsburgh	Co-ed since 1945, though still women-serving; named Mount Mercy College from 1929–1969; renamed Carlow College from 1969–2004.
**Cedar Crest College**			1867–present	Allentown	
Chatham University			1869–2014	Pittsburgh	Co-ed since 2014; named Chatham College from 1955–2007.
Chestnut Hill College			1924–2003	Philadelphia	Co-ed since 2003; named Mount Saint Joseph College from 1924–1938.
Gwynedd Mercy University			1948–1966	Gwynedd Valley	Co-ed since 1966
Holy Family University			1954–1970	Philadelphia	Co-ed since 1970–71; named Holy Family College until 2002.
Harcum College			1915–2003	Bryn Mawr	Co-ed since 2003
Immaculata University			1920–2005	Malvern	Co-ed since 2005; named Villa Maria College from 1920–1929; renamed Immaculata College from 1929–2002.
La Roche University			1963–1970	McCandless	Co-ed since 1970; named La Roche College until 2019.
Margaret Morrison Carnegie College			1903–1973	Pittsburgh	Closed by Carnegie Mellon University in 1973.
Marywood University			1915–1989	Scranton	Co-ed since 1989; named Marywood College until 1997.
Mercyhurst University			1926–1969	Erie	Co-ed since 1969; named Mercyhurst College until 2012.
Misericordia University			1924–1979	Dallas	Co-ed since 1979, named College Misericordia from 1924–2007.
**Moore College of Art and Design**			1848–present	Philadelphia	
Moravian University			1742–1954	Bethlehem	Founded in 1742, has been co-ed since 1954; named Moravian College until 2021.
Mount Aloysius College			1853–1968	Cresson	Co-ed since 1968
Neumann University			1965–1980	Aston	Co-ed since 1980; named Our Lady of Angels College from 1965–1980; renamed Neumann College from 1980–2009.
Pittsburgh Female College			?–1896	Pittsburgh	Closed in 1896.
Rosemont College			1921–2009	Rosemont	Co-ed since 2009; will merge with Villanova University by 2028, when the college will be called Villanova University, Rosemont Campus
Seton Hill University			1885–2002	Greensburg	Co-ed since 2002; named Seton Hill College from 1918–2002.
Susquehanna Female College			?–1872	Selinsgrove	Closed in 1872, students were transferred to the Missionary Institute of the Evangelical Lutheran Church, now named Susquehanna University.
Villa Maria College			?–1989	Erie	Merged into Gannon University in 1989.
Wilson College			1869–2013	Chambersburg	Co-ed since 2013
Woman's Medical College of Pennsylvania			1850–1970	Philadelphia	Co-ed since 1970, now part of Drexel University's College of Medicine.

== Rhode Island ==
Name	Image	Dates of operation	Dates of women-only	City	Notes
Pembroke College		1891–1971	1891–1971	Providence	Formerly a coordinate college of Brown University; fully merged into Brown in 1971.
Salve Regina University		1934–to present	1934–1973	Newport	Co-ed since 1973; named Salve Regina College until 1991.

== South Carolina ==
Name	Image	Dates of operation	Dates of women-only	City	Notes
Anderson University			1911–1930	Anderson	Co-ed since 1930
Chicora College		1893–1930	1893–1930	Greenville and Columbia	Merged with Queens University of Charlotte in 1930.
Coker University			1908–1969	Hartsville	Co-ed since 1969; named Coker College until 2019.
Columbia College			1854–2021	Columbia	Co-ed since 2021
Columbia Female College			?–1888	Columbia	Closed in 1888.
Converse University			1889–2021	Spartanburg	Co-ed since 2021; named Converse College until 2021.
Due West Female College			1859–1927	Due West	Merged with Erskine College in 1927; closed in 1928.
Greenville (Baptist) Female College			?–1938	Greenville	Initially named Greenville Female College, later Greenville Woman's College; merged in 1938 with Furman University, but remained separate until 1961.
Johnson Female University			1856–1863	Anderson	Operated from 1856 to 1863.
Lander University			1872–1943	Greenwood	Co-ed since 1943; named Williamston Female College until 1943.
Laurensville Female College				Laurens	Closing date unknown.
Limestone University			1881–1970	Gaffney	Co-ed since 1970; named Limestone College until 2020; closed in 2025.
Old Cokesbury and Masonic Female College and Conference School			1854–1874		A women's college from 1854–1874; a men's-only college from 1876–1882; became a public school in 1918 and closed in 1954.
Orangeburg Female College				Orangeburg	Closing date unknown.
Reidville Female College				Reidville	Closing date unknown.
South Carolina Female Collegiate Institute			1828–1867	Columbia	Also known as Barhamville Institute; 'Collegiate' added 1835; closed in 1867.
Spartanburg Female College			?–1871	Spartanburg	Closed in 1871.
Summerland College for Women			?–1930	Batesburg	Closed in 1930.
Walhalla Female College			?–1885	Walhalla	Closed in 1885.
Winthrop University			1886–1974	Rock Hill	Co-ed since 1974
Yorkville Female College			?–1880	York	Closed in 1880.

== South Dakota ==
Name	Image	Dates of operation	Dates of women-only	City	Notes
Mount Marty University			1905–1969	Yankton	Co-ed since 1969, named Mount Marty College until 2020.
Presentation College		1951–2023	1951–1968	Aberdeen	

== Tennessee ==
Name	Image	Dates of operation	Dates of women-only	City	Notes
Aquinas College		1961	1961–1962	Nashville	
Athens Female College			1857–1866	Athens	Renamed East Tennessee Wesleyan College in 1866, designated a university the next year. Known as Tennessee Wesleyan University since 2016, having been a college after 1925.
Bolivar College			1850–1907	Madisonville	Operated from 1850–1907; named Bolivar Female Academy from 1850–c. 1890
Belmont College for Young Women			1890–1913	Nashville	Named Belmont College for Young Women from 1890–1913; merged to form Ward–Belmont College from 1913–1950, co-ed since 1951.
Brinckley Female College				Memphis	
Cumberland Female College			1850–1892	McMinnville	Operated 1850–1892.
East Tennessee Female Institute			1827–1911	Knoxville	Operated as the Knoxville Female Academy from 1827–1846.
Martin Female College			1870–1938	Pulaski	Became Martin College in 1908, co-ed in 1938, and was renamed Martin Methodist College in 1986. Sold in 2021, now operates as the University of Tennessee Southern.
Mary Sharp College			1851–1896	Winchester	Operated from 1851 to 1896.
Moses Fisk's Female Academy			1806–?		Founded in 1806.
Lambuth University			1843–1923	Jackson	Became co-ed in 1923; closed in 2011.
Newman College for Women			?–1888	Jefferson City	Merged into Carson-Newman College in 1888.
Soule College for Women			?–1855	Murfreesboro	Closed in 1855.
Tennessee College for Women			?–1946	Murfreesboro	Merged with Cumberland University in 1946.
Ward–Belmont College			1913–1950	Nashville	Closed in 1950.
Ward Seminary for Young Ladies			1865–1913	Nashville	Merged to form Ward–Belmont College in 1913.

== Texas ==
Name	Image	Dates of operation	Dates of women-only	City	Notes
Andrew Female College			1853–1879	Huntsville	
Carr–Burdette College			1894–1929	Sherman	
Chappell Hill Female College			1850–1912	Chappell Hill	
Charnwood Institute		1865–1882	1865–1868, 1874–1882	Tyler	
Eastern Texas Female College		1853–1865	1853–1865	Tyler	Became Charnwood Institute in 1865.
Hillyer Female College			1848–1852	Goliad	Became Paine Female Institute in 1852.
Kidd-Key College			1877–1935	Sherman	Closed in 1935.
Mary Allen Seminary			1886–1933	Crockett	The first black women's college in the state; became co-ed in 1933; closed in 1972.
Mary Connor Female College				Paris	
University of Mary Hardin–Baylor			1851–1971	Belton	Co-ed since 1971, originally the female division of Baylor University.
Our Lady of the Lake University			1911–1969	San Antonio	Co-ed since 1969
University of the Incarnate Word			1881‍–1970	San Antonio and Alamo Heights	Co-ed since 1970, known as the University of the Incarnate Word since 1996.
University of San Antonio			1894–1942	San Antonio	Closed in 1942.
Texas Woman's University			1901–1972	Denton, Dallas and Houston	A Health sciences graduate school went co-ed in 1972; the university has been fully co-ed since 1994.
Tillotson College			1926–1935	Austin	Women's college from 1926 to 1935.
Waco Female College			1857–1895	Waco	Closed in 1895.

== Utah ==
Name	Image	Dates of operation	Dates of women-only	City	Notes
College of Saint Mary-of-the-Wasatch		1875–1969	1875–1969	Salt Lake City	

== Vermont ==
Name	Image	Dates of operation	Dates of women-only	City	Notes
Bennington College			1932–1969	Bennington	Co-ed since 1969.
College of St. Joseph			?–1971	Rutland	Co-ed in 1971, closed in 2019.
Green Mountain College			1863–1974	Poultney	For part of its history, it was a women's college, affiliated with the United Methodist Church, became co-ed in 1974, and closed in 2019.
Trinity College of Vermont			1925–2000	Burlington	Closed in 2000.

== Virginia ==
Name	Image	Dates of operation	Dates of women-only	City	Notes
Averett University			1859–1969	Danville	named Union Female College from 1859 - 1917, renamed Averett College from 1917 - 2001.
Blackstone College		1892–1950	1892–1950	Blackstone	
Chesapeake Female College			1854–1861	Hampton	
Elizabeth College		1896–1922	1896–1922	Salem	
Fauquier Institute			1860–c. 1929	Warrenton	
Hartshorn Memorial College				Richmond	Merged with Virginia Union University in 1932.
Hollins University		1842–to present	1842–?	Roanoke	Virginia's first women-only chartered college. Men are admitted to graduate programs, but not undergraduate.
Longwood University		1839–to present	1839–1976	Farmville	Started as the Farmville Female Seminary
James Madison University			1908–1946	Harrisonburg	de facto co-ed since 1946, officially co-ed since 1966; opened as the State Normal and Industrial School
Marion College		1873–1967	1873–1967	Marion	
Martha Washington College		1860–1931	1860–1931	Abingdon	
Mary Baldwin University		1842–to present	1842–2017	Staunton	Co-ed since 2017, the Virginia Women's Institute for Leadership remains all-female.
Marymount University		1950–to present	1950–1986	Arlington	
Radford University			1910–1972	Radford	Formed as the State Normal and Industrial School for Women at Radford
Randolph College			1891–2007	Lynchburg	named Randolph-Macon Women's College from 1891 - 2007.
Roanoke Women's College			1912–1922		Merged with Elizabeth College in 1915.
Southern Seminary Junior College			1867–1994.	Buena Vista	Became Southern Virginia University
Stratford College				Danville	Closed in 1974.
Sullins College		1868–1976	1868–1976	Bristol	
**Sweet Briar College**		1901– present	1901– present	Sweet Briar	
University of Mary Washington			1908–1970	Fredericksburg	
Virginia Intermont College		1854–2014	1854–1972	Bristol	
Westhampton College			1914–1990	Richmond	Formerly a coordinate college of University of Richmond, both undergraduate schools merged to form a co-ed School of Arts and Sciences in 1990.

== Washington ==
Name	Image	Dates of operation	Dates of women-only	City	Notes
Forest Ridge Junior College			?–1957	Seattle	Closed in 1957.
Fort Wright College			?–1980	Toppenish	Closed in 1980; evolved into co-ed Heritage University.

== West Virginia ==
Name	Image	Dates of operation	Dates of women-only	City	Notes
Alderson Academy		1901–2023	1901–?	Alderson	Merged into Broaddus College in 1932 to become Alderson–Broaddus College; the name Alderson Broaddus University was adopted in 2013; closed in 2023.
Broaddus College		1876–2023	1871–?	Clarksburg and Philippi	Opened as the Broaddus Female College/ Became co-ed in 1894 and moved from Clarksburg to Philippi in 1909. Merged with Alderson Academy to become Alderson–Broaddus College, which closed in 2023.
Greenbrier College		1812–1972	1812–1972	Lewisburg	

== Wisconsin ==
Name	Image	Dates of operation	Dates of women-only	City	Notes
**Alverno College**		1887–present	1887–present	Milwaukee	
Cardinal Stritch University		1937–2023	1937–1970	Milwaukee	
Dominican College of Racine		1864–1974	1864–1955	Racine	
Edgewood University			1927–1970	Madison	named Edgewood College until 2025.
Holy Family College		1935–2020	1935–1969	Manitowoc	
Marian University			1936–1970	Fond du Lac	named Marian College of Fond du Lac until 2008.
Milwaukee-Downer College		1895–1964	1895–1964	Milwaukee	Merged with Lawrence College
**Mount Mary University**			1913–present	Milwaukee	
Viterbo University			1890–1970	La Crosse	named St. Rose Normal School from 1890–1939; Viterbo College from 1939–2000.

== See also ==
- Seven Sisters (colleges)
- Timeline of women's colleges in the United States
- Women's colleges in the Southern United States
- Women's colleges in the United States
- Women's College Coalition
