= Elizabeth College =

Elizabeth College may refer to:

- Elizabeth College (Hobart), Tasmania, Australia
- Elizabeth College (Guernsey), Channel Islands
- Elizabeth College (Virginia), United States

== See also ==
- Elizabeth City State University, North Carolina
