= Beulah Louise Henry =

American business woman and inventor

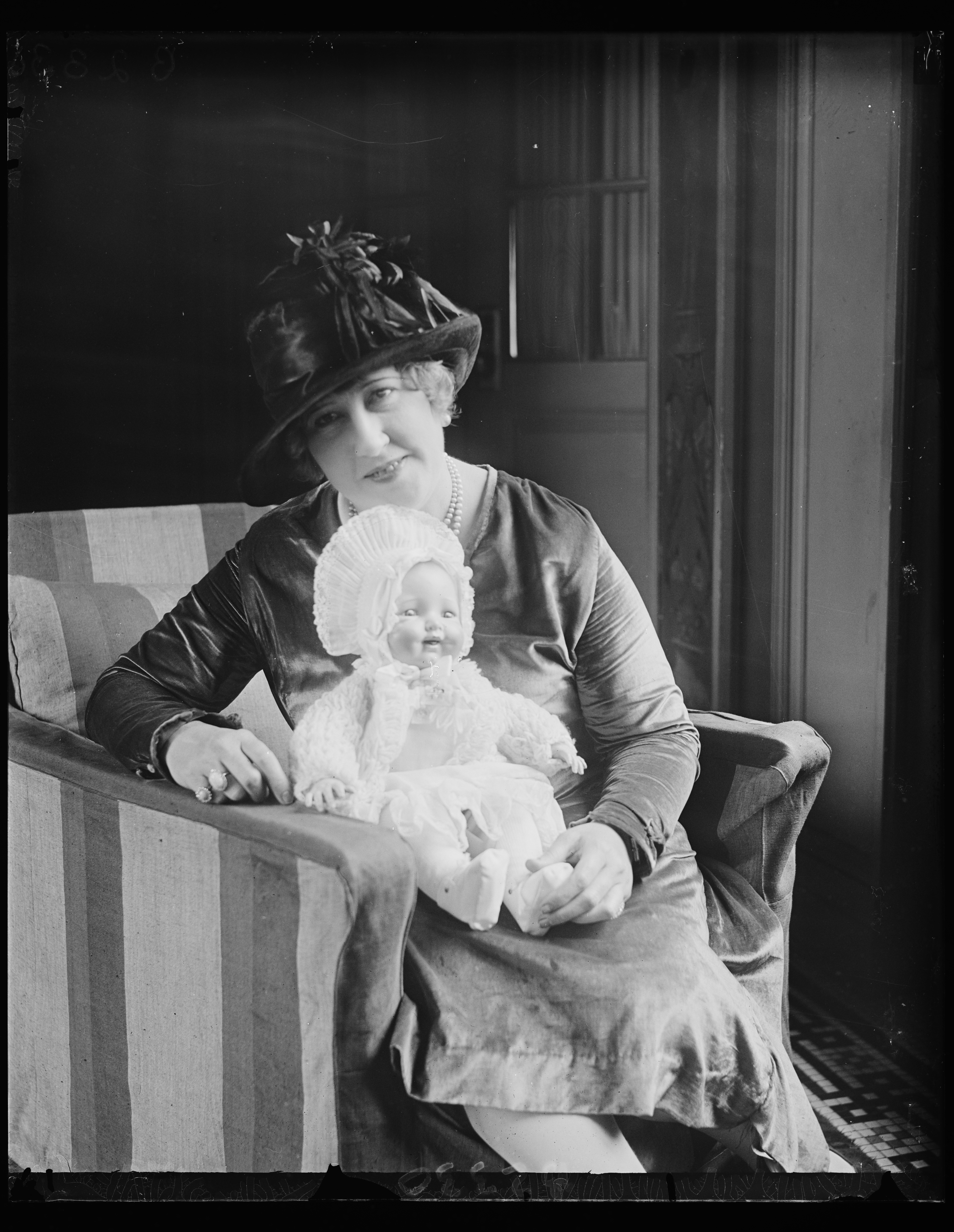
- Louise Henry with her latest invention
- Born: September 28, 1887; Raleigh, North Carolina
- Died: February 1, 1973 (aged 85)
- Education: North Carolina Presbyterian College; Elizabeth College
- Occupations: Inventor, businesswoman
- Awards: National Inventors Hall of Fame

Beulah Louise Henry (September 28, 1887 – February 1, 1973) was an American inventor who made extensive contributions to consumer products and manufacturing technology. Born in Raleigh, North Carolina, and later based in New York City, Henry was a pioneering figure who held 49 patents and developed over 110 inventions, significantly advancing technology while breaking gender barriers in her field.

Her inventions include a bobbin-free sewing machine and a vacuum ice cream freezer. She received 49 patents and had around 110 inventions; when she died, she held far more patents than any other woman. In 2006, she was inducted into the National Inventors Hall of Fame.

== Early life and education ==
Beulah Louise Henry was born on September 28, 1887, in Raleigh, North Carolina, the daughter of Walter R. and Beulah Henry. She was the granddaughter of former North Carolina Governor W. W. Holden and a direct descendant of President Benjamin Harrison and Patrick Henry.

Henry was a creative and inquisitive child. At nine years old, she was drawing sketches of inventions. She enjoyed painting and music, but her favorite hobby was to point out things that she saw wrong and mention changes or innovations that could be made to improve them. One of her first ideas for an invention was a mechanical hat tipper that would tip a man's hat automatically when he greeted someone.

From 1909 to 1912, she attended Elizabeth College in Charlotte, North Carolina. In 1912, prior to graduating, she was awarded her first patent (No. 1,037,762), for a vacuum ice cream freezer that required minimal ice.

== Career in New York City ==
After graduating, Henry moved with her mother to New York City to pursue her inventing career. There she founded the Henry Umbrella and Parasol Company, and, later, the B.L. Henry Company. From 1939 to 1955, she worked as an inventor for the Nicholas Machine Works. She also served as a consultant for many companies that manufactured her inventions, including the Mergenthaler Linotype Company and the International Doll Company.

She lived in New York hotels, belonged to a variety of scientific societies, and never married. From her hotel, she would hire model makers, draftsmen, and patent lawyers to turn her ideas into commercial inventions.

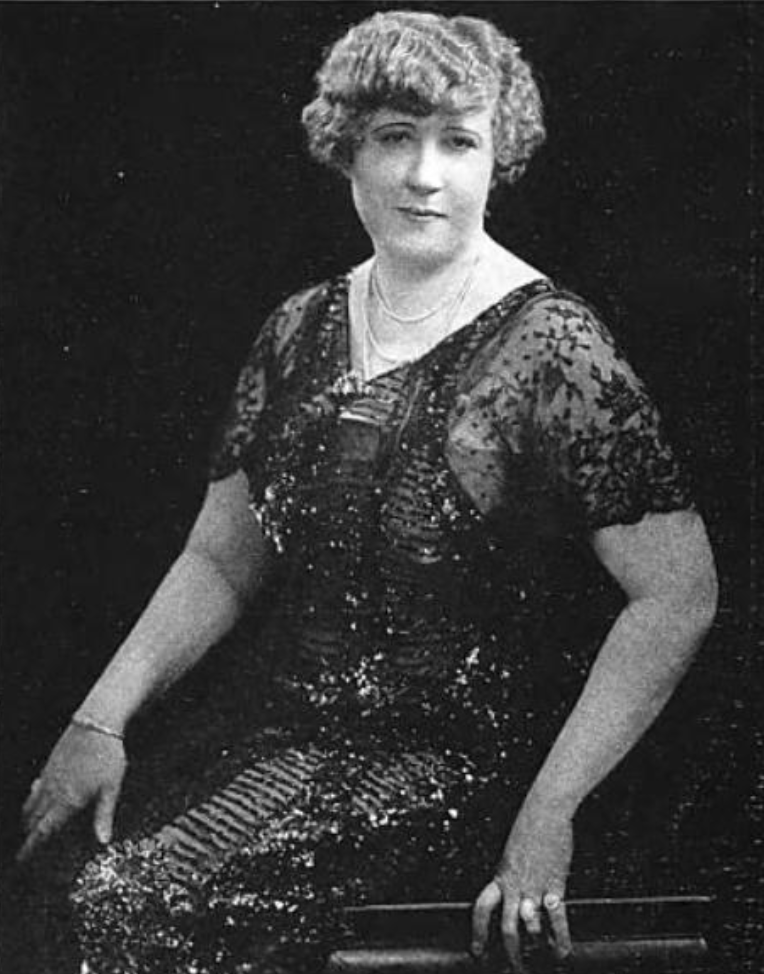
Henry, from a 1928 publication

== Significant inventions ==
Different than most inventors of the time, Henry's inventions did not always follow the same theme or category. But many of her inventions were to improve the quality of life for women, including a hair curler, vanity case, and a rubber sponge soap holder. One of her more prominent inventions was a "snap-on" parasol, which would allow women to change their parasol's pattern to match their outfit without needing to buy an entirely new parasol.

For children's toys, Henry invented a new method for stuffing dolls. As a substitute to using traditional, heavy stuffing, she devised a way to inflate lifelike dolls and toys with rubber tubing, significantly reducing the toys' weight.

One of Henry's most famous inventions is the "Double Chain Stitch Sewing Machine". She wanted to make a sewing machine that would not tangle the thread. Bobbins were the traditional method of feeding the bottom layer of thread in a sewing machine but need to be rewound frequently and the thread was prone to snapping. Her invention doubled the speed of the typical sewing machine and allowed the user to use smaller threads, while the stitch was just as strong. This invention allowed seamstresses at the time to do larger loads and take on more jobs by eliminating time unnecessarily spent on fixing and untangling threads twisted by the bobbin. This invention is still used today in an adapted form. It is primarily used in factories as it is faster than the typical sewing machine and breaks less often.

A Henry invention, patented in 1936, was a tool that enabled the writing of multiple copies of a document on a typewriter without the use of carbon paper.

Henry didn’t have any formal education in engineering, which made her more creative when it came to solutions. She claimed that the design would generally come to her fully formed in her head, but because she didn’t have any education in engineering, she had someone make the product for her. She made great use of prototyping with things she could find around her home such as soap, clips and buttons. If the engineers told her it couldn’t be done she would build it with on hand supplies to try and further convince them.

1. Protograph (1932) - A device that added multiple typewriting functions to typewriters, allowing for the production of multiple copies without carbon paper, which was a precursor to modern multifunction printers.
2. Bobbin-free Sewing Machine (1940) - Introduced a sewing machine that did not require a bobbin, simplifying the sewing process and making it accessible to non-professionals.
3. Doll with Bendable Arms - Enhanced realism and playability in children's dolls, showcasing Henry's attention to user-centered design in consumer products.
4. Double-ended Umbrella - Improved user comfort by protecting against adverse weather from multiple directions.
5. Vacuum-sealed Ice Cream Freezer - Simplified the homemade ice cream making process, making it more practical for everyday use.

A partial list of Henry's inventions includes:

- Vacuum ice cream freezer (1912) US 1037762
- Umbrella with a variety different colored snap-on cloth covers (1924)
- First bobbinless sewing machine (1940)
- "Protograph" – worked with a manual typewriter to make four copies of a document (1932)
- "Continuously-attached Envelopes" for mass mailings (1952)
- "Dolly Dips" soap-filled sponges for children (1929)
- "Miss Illusion" doll with eyes that could change color and close (1935)
- Hair Curler (1925)
- Parasol Bag (1925)
- Umbrella Runner Shield Attachment (1926)
- Water-Sport Apparatus (1927)
- Poodle-Dog Doll (1927)
- Ball Covering (1927)
- Foot Covering (1927)
- Sealing Device for Inflatable Bodies (1929)
- Valve For Inflatable Articles (1929)
- Henry Closure Construction (1930)
- Henry Valve for Inflatable Articles (1931)
- Duplicating Device for Typewriting Machines (1932)
- Duplicating Attachment for Typewriters (1932)
- Writing Machine (1936)
- Multicopy Attachment for Typewriters (1936)
- Movable Eye Structure for figure Toys (1935)
- Double Chain Stitch Sewing Machine (1936)
- Feeding and Aligning Device (1940)
- Seam and Method of Forming Seams (1941)
- Sewing Apparatus (1941)
- Typewriting Machine (1941)
- Device for Producing Articulate Sounds (1941)
- Duplex Sound Producer (1944)
- Continuously Attached Envelopes (1952)
- Can Opener (1956)
- Direct and Return Mailing Envelope (1962)

== Quotes ==
"If necessity is the mother of invention, then resourcefulness is the father"

"I invent because I cannot help it – new things just thrust themselves on me"

== Recognition ==
Henry received recognition during her life for her many inventions, working for many different companies as an innovator in New York City, such as the Mergenthaler Linotype Company as well as International Doll Company. Even though these companies often put their names on her work, she still was able to profit from these inventions and still received credit from these companies for her work on the inventions. At the time of her registering her patents, only 2% of all those patents were registered by women, making her truly impressive in her particular field and era. She is still considered one of the most successful female inventors of all time. After death, Henry was inducted into the National Inventors Hall of Fame in 2006.
