= Fauquier Institute =

Women's school and college in Virginia, US

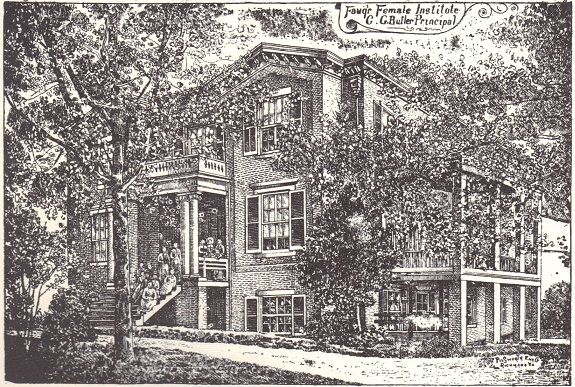
- Fauquier Institute, pre 1908

Location
- 194 East Lee Street; Warrenton, Fauquier, Virginia; United States

Information
- Other names: Fauquier Female Institute Fauquier Institute for Girls
- School type: Private
- Religious affiliation: None
- Opened: October 1860
- Closed: c. 1929
- Principal: J. S. Bacon
- Principal: George A. Bulter
- Principal: Nellie V. Butler
- Grades: 1-12, College
- Campus size: 10 acres (4.0 ha)
- Colors: Red and White
- Affiliation: Association of Colleges and Schools for Girls

The Fauquier Institute or Fauquier Female Institute was a small private school in Warrenton, Virginia, United States. It operated from 1860 through the late 1920s. It was a boarding school and a day school, teaching primary, preparatory, and collegiate female students. It advertised "elegant accommodations, excellent advantages, reliable terms".

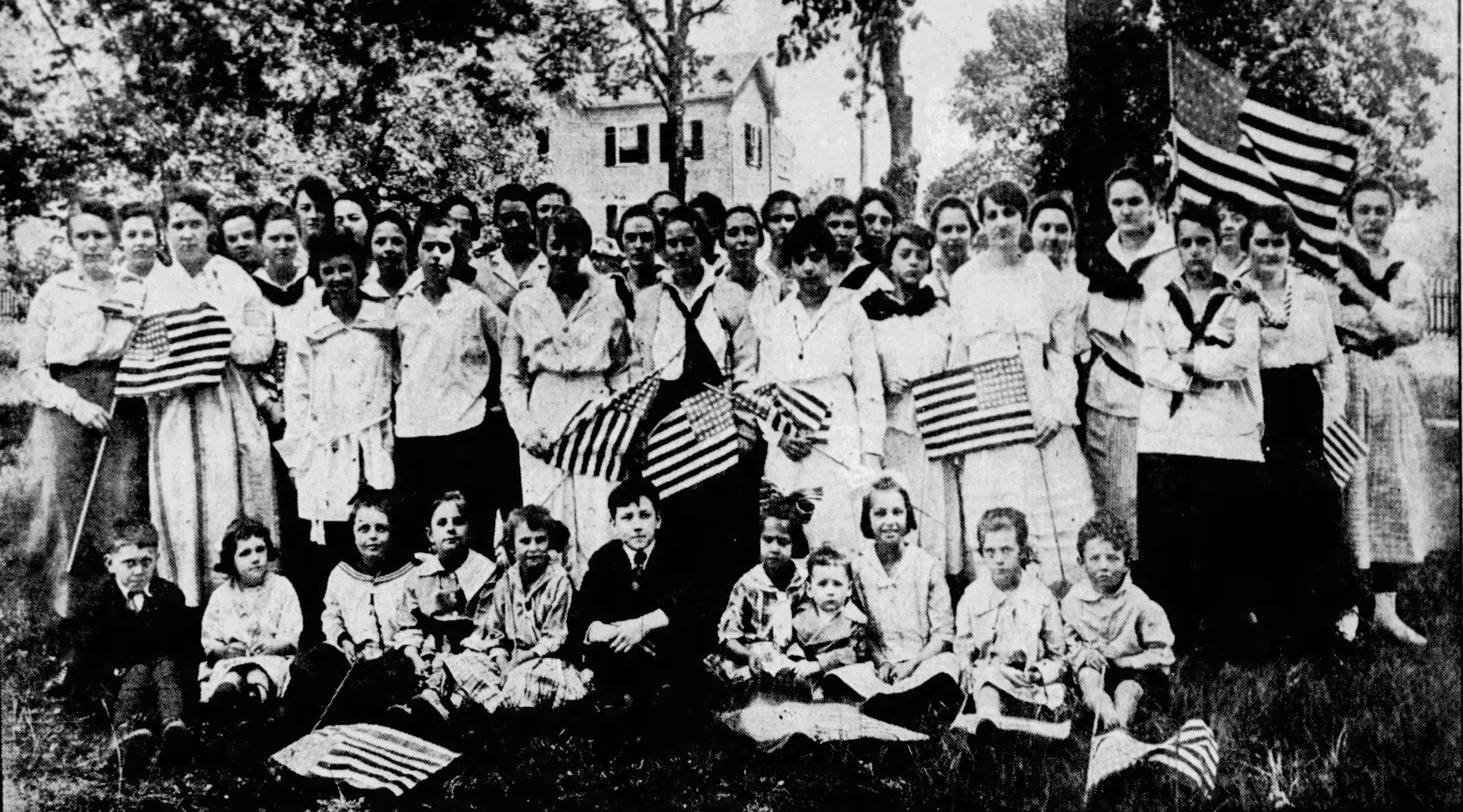
Students at Fauquier Institute, July 1917

== History ==
In 1857, a group of investors purchased seven acres with a house in Warrenton, Virginia, from William F. Phipps, to establish a girls' school, the tentatively called the Fauquier Female Seminary. Rather than using the existing brick house, they hired John R. Spilman of Warrenton to build a new, large school house.

Fauquier Female Institute opened in October 1860. It claimed to provide a "quiet, retired, and healtful situation" to educate women in "these agitating times". It was a boarding school and a day school for local students. Its original principals were J. S. Bacon, DD and R. P. Latham, A.M. In July 1866, the school property was purchased by Rev. H. H. Wyer of Louisa County, Virginia. He moved to the Institute and oversaw its operation with Bacon.

In August 1868, the school was operated by Wyer and J. B. Budwell. It was sold to John A. Spilman and Dr. Robert Frazer in 1871. Frazer was in charge of the institute. In 1875, Mr. Averett who had been the institute's principal, left to start a school for boys in Culpepper. Miss A. Taylor of Baltimore, Maryland rented the school in July 1875, with plans to open it in September. In September, a newspaper reported that a Prof. Dowdy from Louden County, Virginia was now in charge of the school.

Frazier became the sole owner of the institute in 1877 and was its principal. He left in 1882 to become the president of the Judson Female Institute in Alabama and was, later, president of Longwood College in Virginia. In August 1882, Rev. Dr. J. A. Chambliss, pastor of the Citadel Square Baptist Church of Charleston, South Carolina became the president of the institute. Rev. Alexander Fleet, previously the pastor of the Broad Run Baptist Church, became the institute's principal in 1886.

In February 1887, the institute was purchased for $10,000 by Prof. Ayres of Marion, Alabama. Fleet returned to his prior home in Essex County, Virginia. George A. Bulter was the school's principal in 1887; he previously had a private boarding school in Pottstown, Pennsylvania. Major Robert P. Barry purchase the Fauquier Female Institute for $8,000 in July 1888. Barry leased the institute to Butler who operated the school with his wife, Adelaide, and their daughters Nellie and Edith. Butler remained principal of the institute until his death on August 7, 1908.

In 1890, the school began opening as a summer resort for private boarding during the summer months. This was an attempt to balance the institute's budget. The Richmond Dispatch reported that the school had applicants for students from Puerto Rico and other distant locations in 1902. That year, the institute had its highest number of students in its history and had to turn away qualified students due to a lack of space.

Miss Nellie V. Butler became the institute's principal after the death of her father, George Butler, operating it along with her sisters Alice and Edith. By 1912, the institute was a member of the Association of Colleges and Schools for Girls. The institute was purchased from Barry by local businessmen Joseph and Herman Ullman in 1915. Nellie and Alice Butler retired in 1923. Three teachers stayed and attempted to keep the school open. In 1923, Miss May Strother and Mrs. Katherine D. Carr took over the institute. In 1926, ads called the school the Fauquier Institute for Girls.

Although sources suggest that the institute closed in either 1923 or 1925, it was advertised for the 65th session in the fall of 1926. In addition, the Virginia Division's Committee for Education of the United Daughters of the Confederacy gave a $100 scholarship for a student in the preparatory school or college for the 1927–28, 1928–29, and 1929–30 school years. Mrs. R. L. Kenner was institute's principal in the spring of 1928 and the director of a summer school at the institute in 1928.

After it closed, the institute building was turned into a boarding house and apartments. The Ullman brother sold the property and nine acres to Vincent O. Jacobs in October 1945.

== Campus ==
The campus was located on ten acres in Fauquier County, Virginia (now 139 Culpeper Street in Warrenton). It included a three-story brick building constructed for the school and to board the students. The Italiante style building features four central interior chimneys, a hipped roof, and corbelled brickwork, along with gabled pavilions. It was described as "a handsome building surrounded by beautiful grounds".

It was near Fauquier White Sulphur Springs and was fifty miles from Washington, D.C. The campus had an elevation of 700 feet and had views of the Blue Ridge Mountains. It was accessible by railroad, being on a branch of Richmond and Danville Railroad.

== Students and faculty ==
The school included up to 26 boarding students, about 40 day students, and eleven faculty members.

== Academics ==
The school included primary, preparatory, and collegiate levels. Students learned reading, writing, arithmetic, geography, French, Latin, psychology, and poetry.

When the school first opened, tuition was $25 for the primary school, $30 or $40 for the preparatory school, and $50 for the collegiate school. In addition to the curriculum, students could pay $20 extra for instruction in an ancient or modern language; $50 for, music lessons with harp, guitar, or piano (it was $10 extra for use of the piano); and $20 each for classes in embroidery, drawing or painting. Boarding, including lights and fuel, was $150 per session, with $15 for washing. The school year consisted of one session that started in October and ended in the first week of July. In 1879, tuition and boarding were $200, with classes starting in September. Commencement was held in May.

In 1904, the commencement exercises included a performance of a chorus, a display of calisthenics to music, and a demonstration of the use of dumbbells. In 1907 and 1908, the student demonstrations at graduation included a performance by the violin class, elocution presentations, and demonstrations of tennis, a drill with the Indian clubs by the physical culture class.

In 1925, the institute offered secretarial sources in addition to French, music, and outdoor sports.

== Student life ==
Students participated in activities such as chorus and theater. Its music students also gave concerts for the community and the school's patrons. In 1906, its number of boarding students was limited to 26. The King’s Daughters of Warrenton established a Good Will Circle at the institute in 1889; it operated there until the school closed. The institute also had the Epsilon chapter for Alpha Sigma Alpha from 1905 to 1907.

The school's colors were red and white.

== Notable alumnae ==
- Maude Turner Gordon, actress

== See also ==
- List of colleges and universities in Virginia
- List of current and historical women's universities and colleges in the United States
