= Capitol Park (Tuscaloosa, Alabama) =

Coordinates: 33°12′28″N 87°34′27″W

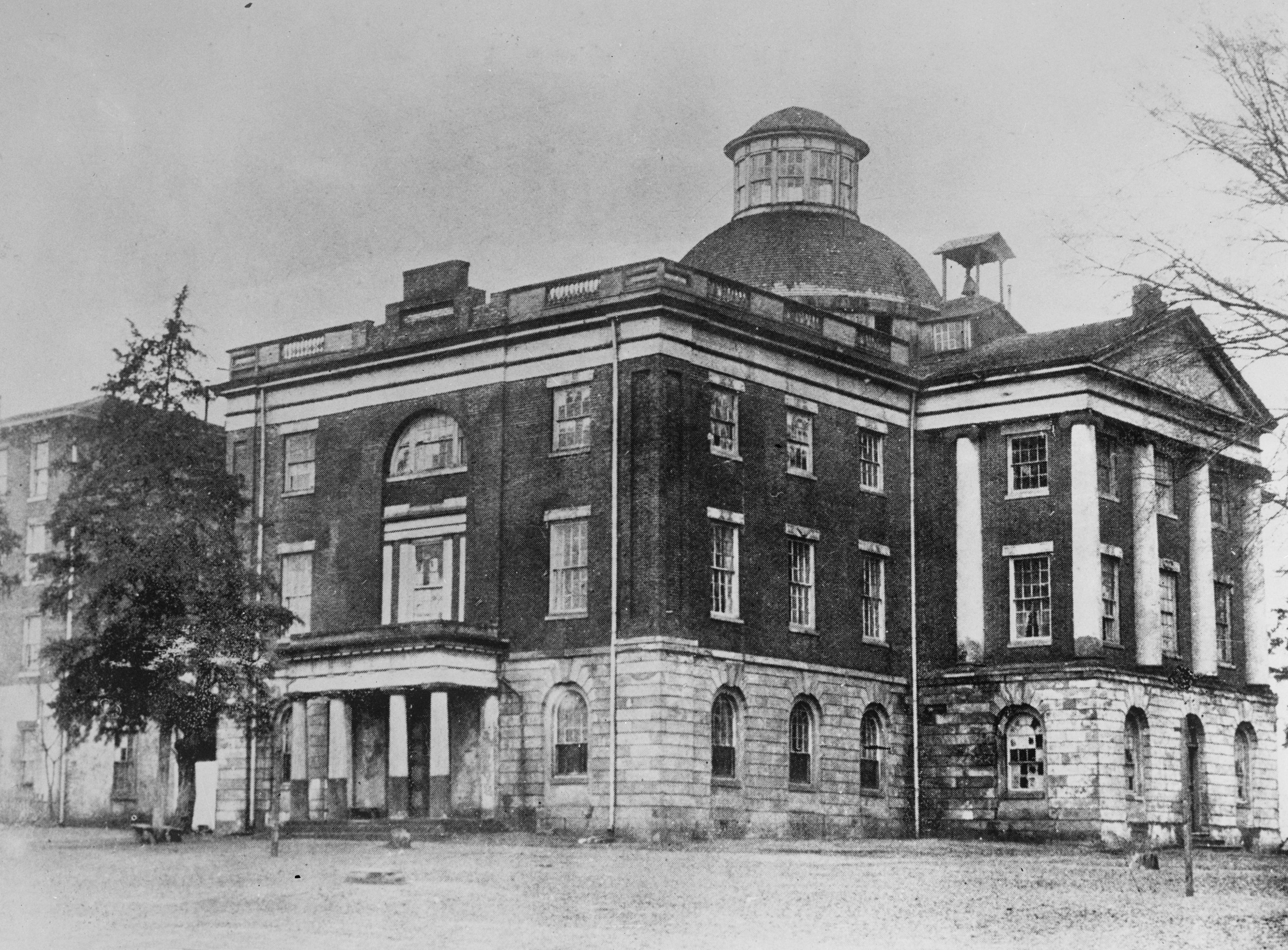
Alabama State Capitol building in Tuscaloosa

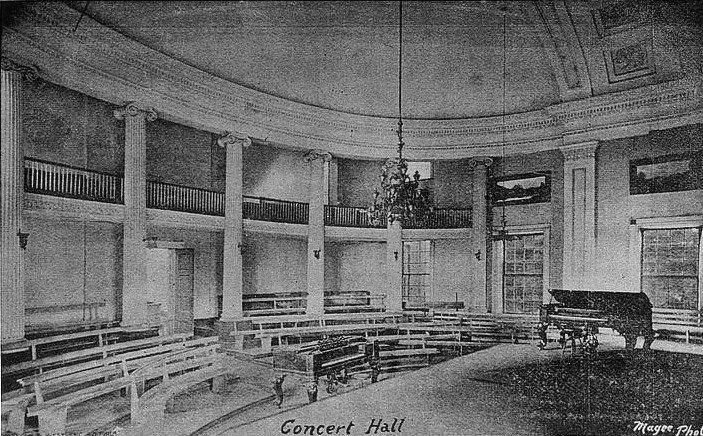
Concert Hall at Alabama Central Female College

Spring at the park

Ruins

Capitol Park is a park in Tuscaloosa, Alabama on a bluff on at Childress Hill above the Black Warrior River. It was the site of the Alabama State Capitol from 1826 to 1846, when the capitol was moved to Montgomery. The capitol building was subsequently used for Alabama Central Female College. It burned in 1923. A historical marker in the park commemorates the school's history. The University of Alabama has a collection of papers related to the school. Classical architecture ruins from the building (a mixture of reconstituted original ornamentation and 1980s-era reconstruction) remain.

== History ==
Tuscaloosa succeeded Cahaba as Alabama's state capitol. The Childress Hill site fronting Broad Street and adjacent to the river was selected for the new capitol building, designed by English architect William Nichols. In 1829, Alabama Governor Gabriel Holmes addressed the legislature in the new building.

The capitol building became Alabama Central Female College. It burned down in 1923.

== Legacy ==
According to The Tuscaloosa News, by the "Great Depression, the ruins of the burned statehouse were dispersed or massed into a low mound with grass on top." In 1988, "a design committee, which included architectural historian Robert Mellown...began extensive historical and archaeological research...and drew up plans to create a ruin." A historical marker in the park commemorates the school's history. The University of Alabama has a collection of papers related to the school.

A poem about the old capitol was published. The western end of the 4.5-mile Riverwalk begins at Capitol Park.

Located at the South West Corner in the McGuire Strickland House since 1993 is The Capitol School. It is a private school serving students from 6 weeks through High school.

== See also ==
- List of current and historical women's universities and colleges in the United States
- Artificial ruins
- Folly
