= Woman's Medical College of St. Louis =

Homeopathic medical college

The Woman's Medical College of St. Louis (sometimes St. Louis Woman's Medical College) was a homeopathic medical college for women located in St. Louis, Missouri. It opened first opened in 1883 as a branch of the Western Homeopathic Medical College, and then later reopened as a separate entity in 1891.

== First college ==
The Woman's College of 1883 was opened to serve as a way for women to obtain medical degrees in the state of Missouri. According to The History of American Homeopathy, "the orthodox medical educational community resisted the admission of women students longer than did the homeopathic and eclectic schools," meaning most women of the period who aspired to be doctors had to attend alternative institutions. The college "held only one course of lectures" before closing in 1884.

== Second college ==
In 1891, a new Woman's College was incorporated by T. J. Beattie, J. Block, C.A. Dannaker, and R.S. Sloan. Now separate from the Western College, this new incarnation was the first college west of the Mississippi River that existed solely for the education of women in medicine. The first classes were held in September 1892.

The opening of the college was met with opposition from the local medical community. The St. Louis-based Medical Mirror published an editorial saying that "[w]omen are not endowed by nature or art with the qualities, nor can they gain the necessary equipment for making a successful physician." Following the graduation of the first class in 1894, the Medical Mirror reported that the St. Louis Board of Health "found it inexpedient to admit women to the hospitals as assistant physicians [interns] ... inasmuch as the admission of women would mark a change from the established order of things." According to Clevenger, only one graduate, Henrietta Borck, was ever admitted to the St. Louis Medical Society, nineteen years after her graduation.

Following a move to a new building, the Woman's College was affected by the Panic of 1893 and began to struggle financially. It closed permanently in 1896.

== See also ==
- List of current and historical women's universities and colleges in the United States
