= Huntsville Female College =

College in Alabama, US (1851–1895)

Coordinates: 34.7329°N 86.5813°W

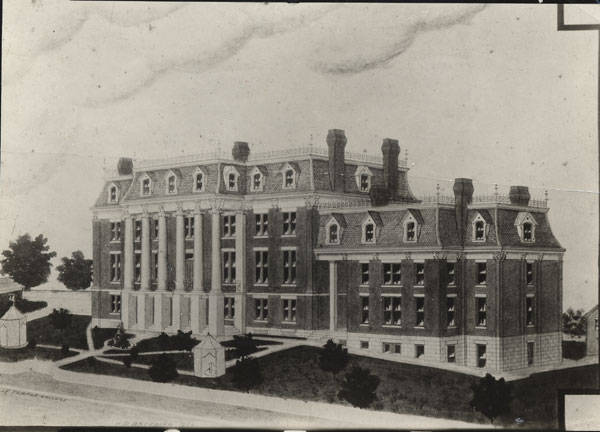

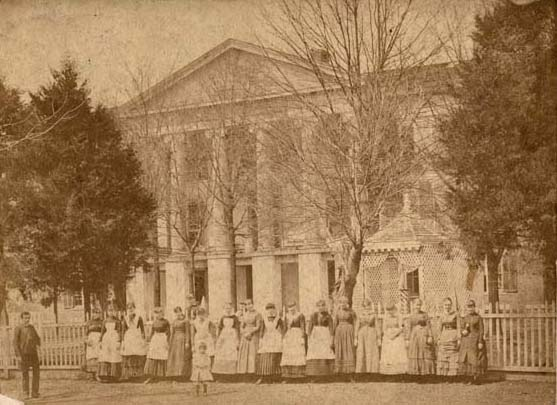

Huntsville Female College (1851–1895) was a school in Huntsville, Alabama. The school burned January 4, 1895. A historical marker commemorates its history. It was designed by the architect George Gilliam Steele.

== History ==
The school was organized by the Methodist Episcopal Church. The school was established and given a state charter as Bascom Female Institute. Catalogues for the school are extant and held by the Alabama Department of Archives & History. The state archive also contains group and individual portraits of students.

The school was on the north side of Randolph Street. Rev. A. B. Jones served as a president of the school.

The school building was used as a hospital during the American Civil War. The students and their trunks were saved from the fire but one man taking out furniture was injured. Classes were scheduled to resume at Alabama Military Academy.

== Legacy ==
Duke University has a four page circular advertising the school.

== See also ==
- List of current and historical women's universities and colleges in the United States

== See also ==
- Women's colleges in the United States
- List of women's universities and colleges in the United States
