= Maria Brewster Brooks Stafford =

American educator

Maria Stafford
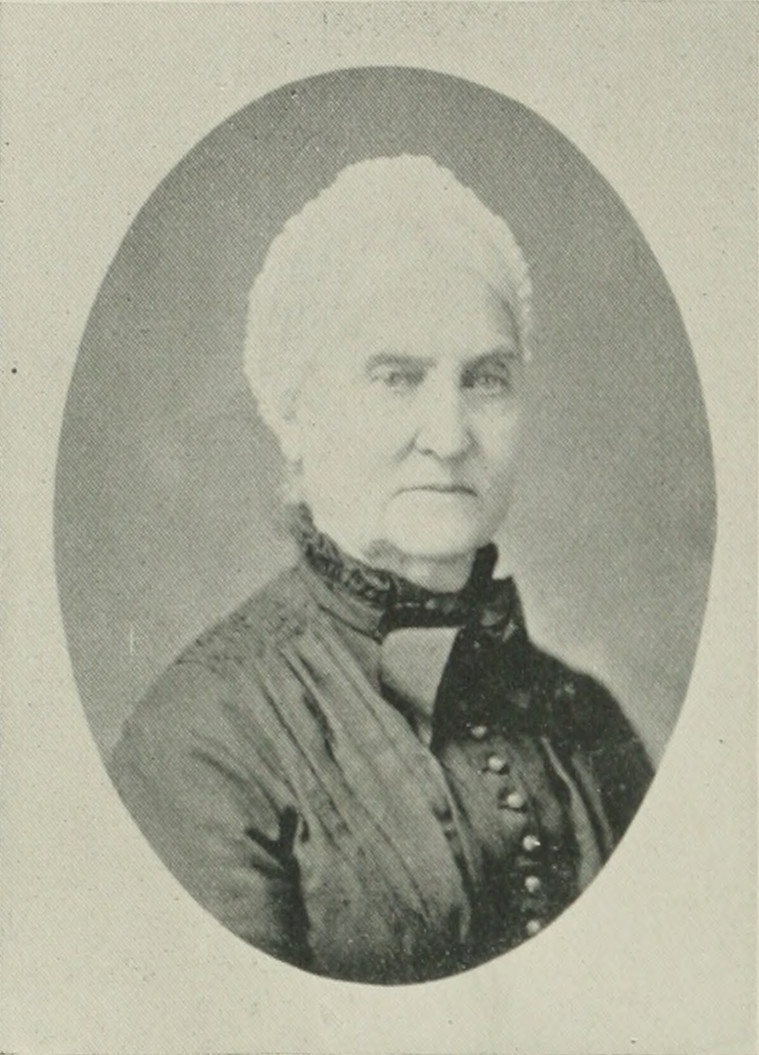
- Portrait from A Woman of the Century
- Born: Maria Brewster Brooks; 1809; Westmoreland, New Hampshire, U.S.
- Died: July 28, 1896; Asbury Park, New Jersey, U.S.
- Occupation: Educator
- Spouse: Samuel McKee Stafford (m. 1839; died 1873)
- Children: 3

Maria Brewster Brooks Stafford (1809–1896) was an American educator.

== Early life and education ==
Maria Brewster Brooks was born in Westmoreland, New Hampshire, in 1809. Her parents were of English origin. Of their five daughters, all were married early, except Maria, who remained in school for a thorough education.

== Career ==
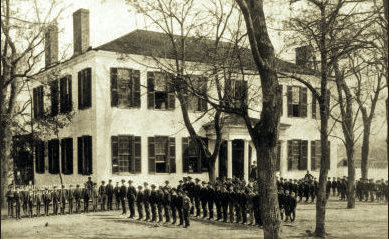
Stafford School

In 1833, she was invited by Rev. William Williams, whose wife was her friend, to go to Alabama as assistant teacher in the Alabama Female Institute. She became the central figure in that school and taught until she married Prof. Samuel Stafford, of Tuscaloosa, Alabama. He was a North Carolinian by birth and education. He served as professor of ancient literature in the University of Alabama, where he remained from 1837 until 1856, resigning because of failing health. Prof. and Mrs. Stafford were then invited to take charge of the Alabama Female Institute. For several years, Mrs. Stafford gave all her time to the work of educating and character-building. She closed her school during the Civil War and opened it anew in 1865.

She taught till 1872. After purchasing the Alabama Female Institute property, it was converted into the Stafford School (1876–85), a boys' school. In 1888, she sold the property to the city of Tuscaloosa for public school purposes.

== Personal life ==
Maria married Samuel McKee Stafford (1795–1873) on January 17, 1839. They had three children: Belle (1840–1918), Frederick (1842–1920), Alice (1844–1880).

In 1884, Stafford went to live with her daughter, Belle, the wife of Rev. J. P. Dawson, of Danville, Kentucky. Her son, Frederick, lived in Chattanooga, Tennessee.

Maria Brewster Brooks Stafford died in Asbury Park, New Jersey, July 28, 1896.
