= Barleywood Female University =

- Type: Women's College
- Active: 1852–1853
- Location: Rochester, New York, United States
- Campus: Urban

Barleywood Female University was a short-lived women's college in Rochester, New York. It is notable for having been one of the first institutions of higher learning for women in the state and for its connection to the University of Rochester.

== History ==
Following the 1850 establishment of the University of Rochester, then a men's college, local leaders decided a women's college was also necessary. In 1851, railroad investor Azariah Boody and anthropologist Lewis H. Morgan collaborated to found Barleywood Female University, also informally known as Rochester Female College.

Local donors pledged $15,000 to open Barleywood, and land for the campus was donated by Boody. With Boody as president and Morgan serving on the board of trustees, Barleywood opened in 1852 and quickly gained the support of many within the University of Rochester community, including several faculty members who chose to teach at the institution. A brochure circulated by Boody to promote the college stated:

There is no good reason why female education should not be as thorough, as systematic, and also as cheap as it is in our colleges; or why female seminaries should not bear with them a favorable comparison. The only way to build up such institutions, and to make them instruments of widespread usefulness is to secure to them large, liberal, and permanent endowments.

After a successful early start, however, Barleywood was quickly met with financial problems. The college sank into debt and was closed in 1853, with Boody donating the college's land to the University of Rochester.

Subsequent attempts to revive the university or start another women's college in Rochester failed, and it was not until 1898 that the University of Rochester became fully coeducational, a development that took place largely thanks to lobbying from local women's rights activist Susan B. Anthony.

== See also ==
- List of current and historical women's universities and colleges in the United States
- List of defunct colleges and universities in New York
