= Artificial ruins =

Type of folly structure

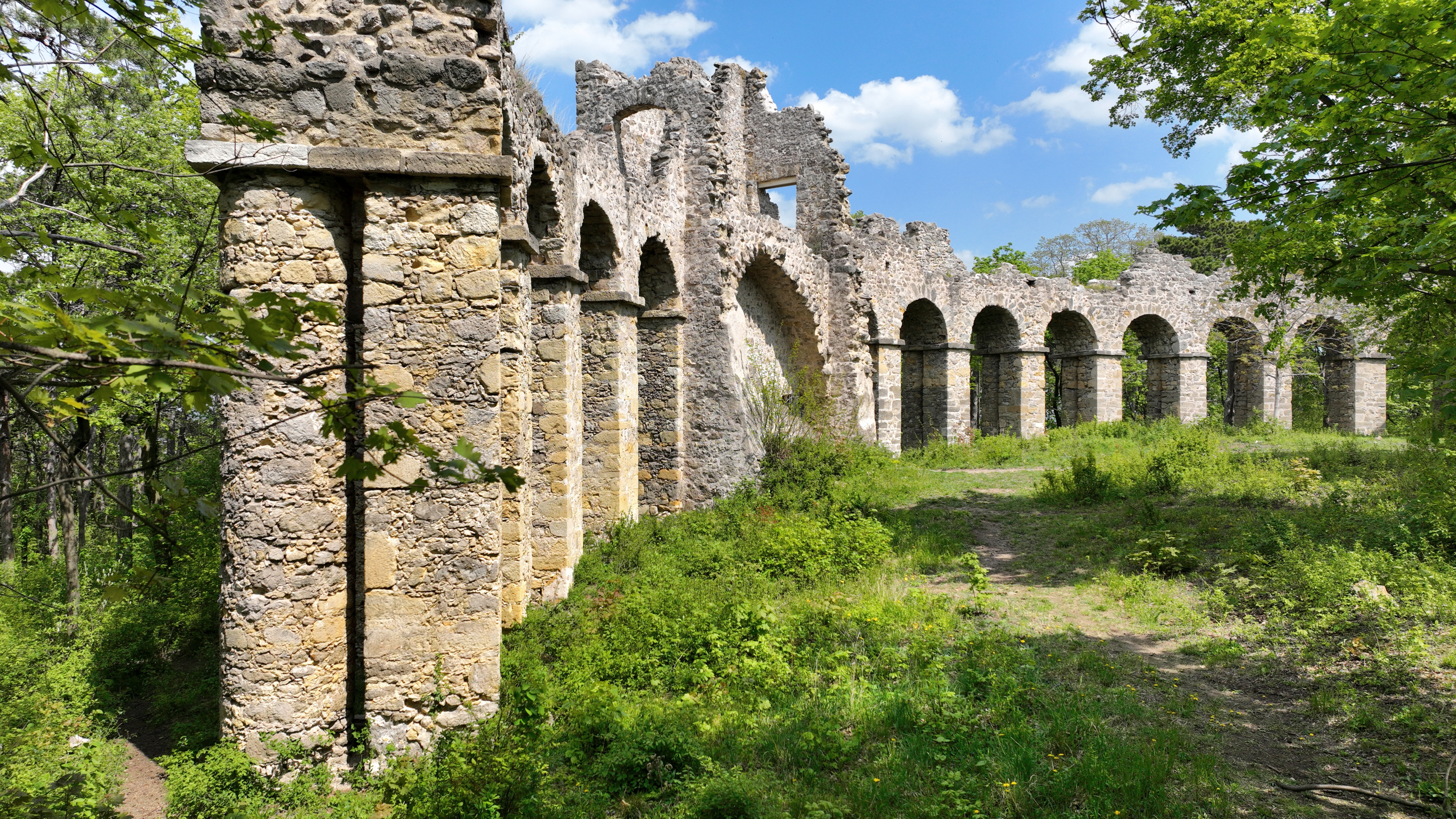
The amphitheater, an artificial ruins in Maria Enzersdorf, built in 1810/11

Artificial ruins or imitation ruins are edifice fragments built to resemble real remnants of ancient ruins in European landscape parks and estates of the nobility of the 18th and 19th centuries. Ruins were built to aestheticize the destruction of time; man-made ruins were designed to evoke a melancholic and romantic mood in the observer.

== History ==
Decorative artificial ruins appeared in the second half of the 18th century in landscape parks in England and France as architectural follies (French: fabriques) and did not go out of fashion throughout the 19th century; sometimes romantic ruins eventually turned into significant artifacts themselves. In addition to England and France, romantic ruins were common in Germany, Belgium, Poland, Austria, Sweden, Norway, Denmark, Russian Empire and Netherlands. Romantic ruins were placed in such a way as to attract the attention of visitors during walks. They differed greatly in style, shape and choice of material, most often they were built in the form of ruins of Roman buildings and temples, medieval castles, towers, Triumphal Arches, Gothic abbeys, pavilions and even mills, forges and other utilitarian buildings.

The fashion for ruins began with the discovery of Herculaneum and in 1738 and Pompeii in 1748, after which excavations and studies of ancient sites began to be carried out throughout Europe. Well-preserved antique buildings in Italy with cleaned frescoes have become part of the European cultural code: Pompeii has become a mandatory point in the Grand Tour of Europe. The Baroque and neoclassicism gave the Greco-Roman antiquities the status of an aesthetic canon, and therefore the ruins, especially the well-preserved ones, joined the list of role models. The engravings Piranesi emphasized the difference between the majestic ancient buildings and the utilitarian architecture of modernity; thus, the artist symbolically judged the culture of the present.

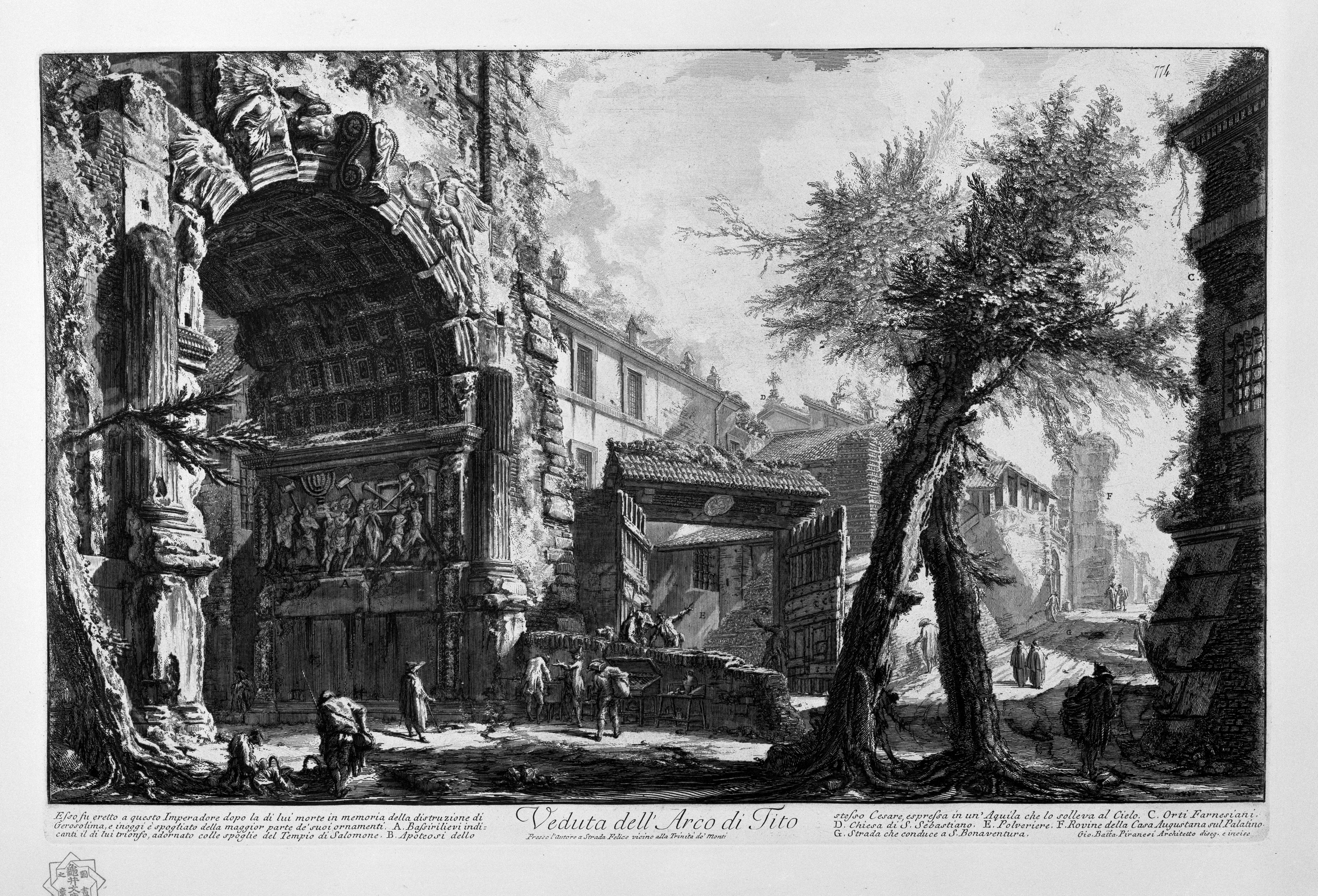
Arch of Titus, engraving by Piranesi. Served as a model for the artificial "Roman ruins" in Schönbrunn

The ruins became an object of nature for many artists of that time. The landscapes depicting vedutas of Roman Campagna inspired Nicolas Poussin and Claude Lorrain, who placed mythological subjects in the Roman pastoral landscape. The artists conveyed the picturesque kinship of ruins and landscape, idealized nature and endowed it with essential meanings.

== Symbolism and aestheticization of ruins ==
Ruins in manors and parks were designed to encourage contemplators to reflect on the influence of time and the frailty of human life, to contribute to the melancholic and romantic mood of the observer.

As the English writer of the 18th century Thomas Whately wrote in his popular handbook on the poetics of English gardens, "at the sight of ruins, thoughts of variability, destruction and devastation naturally come to mind, and behind them stretches a long string of other images, slightly tinged with melancholy, which the ruins inspire".

In Western Europe, ruins began to be perceived as ruins and preserved in this capacity during the Renaissance. During the Enlightenment, the ruins acquired a special value, and began to be endowed with a variety of properties and functions – historical, psychological, political and philosophical. There was a desire to preserve the ruins to maintain a sense of integrity and coherence of history, as signs of the great past. In Western societies, ruins have played an important role in consolidating national identity. Philosophers, from Denis Diderot to Jean Baudrillard, began to pay attention to the significance of the ruins and tried to uncover the secret of the attractiveness of the ruins.

Diderot believed that the usefulness of ruins is that they stimulate desire and create subjectivity, which constrains society. The ruins speak of the great equality of all things before death, but at the same time allow a person to "feel more alone", balancing on the very edge of the "stream" that "drags nations one after another into the abyss common to all." Diderot argued that ruins bring us back to our inclinations, as time and death challenge the meaning of communities and peoples.

The German philosopher Georg Simmel also participated in the glorification of the ruins. In his famous 1907 essay "Ruin: an Aesthetic Experience," Simmel wrote about the essentially reconciling effect of ruins on a person and that a ruin is paradoxically a window into the future, showing that an object that has turned into a ruin continues to exist and develop even after it has been subjected to "violence that the spirit he performed on him, shaping him in his own image." Simmel believed that ruins are not synonymous with decomposition, because they create a "new form" and a "new meaning".

== Gallery ==
Ruins built by order of Frederick the Great in 1748 on the hill of Ruinenberg, Sans Souci, Potsdam

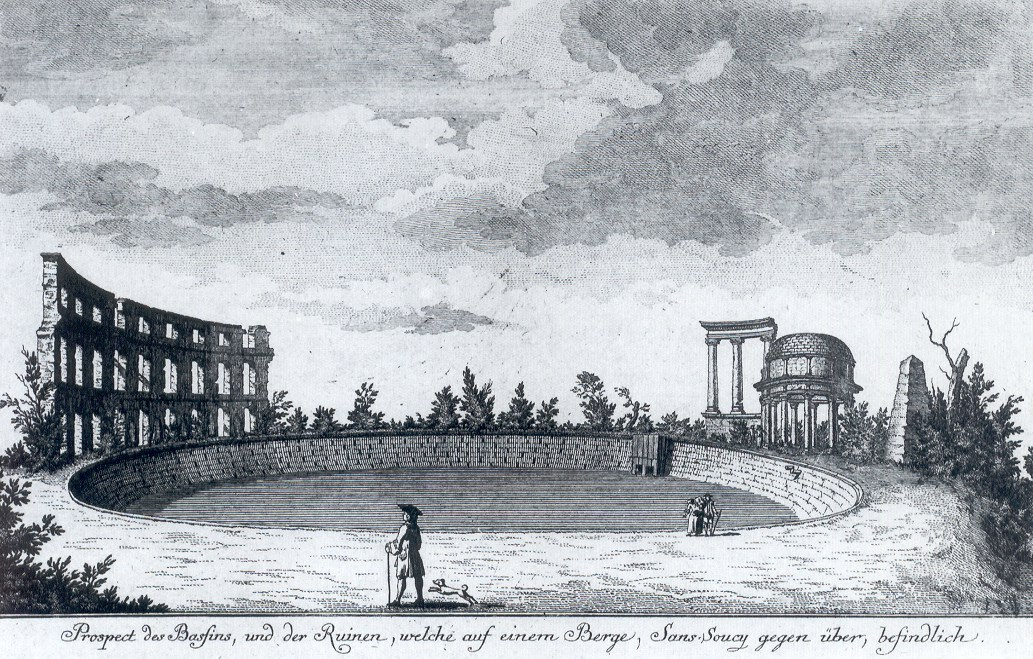
Engraving by Johann Friedrich Schelling, 1775

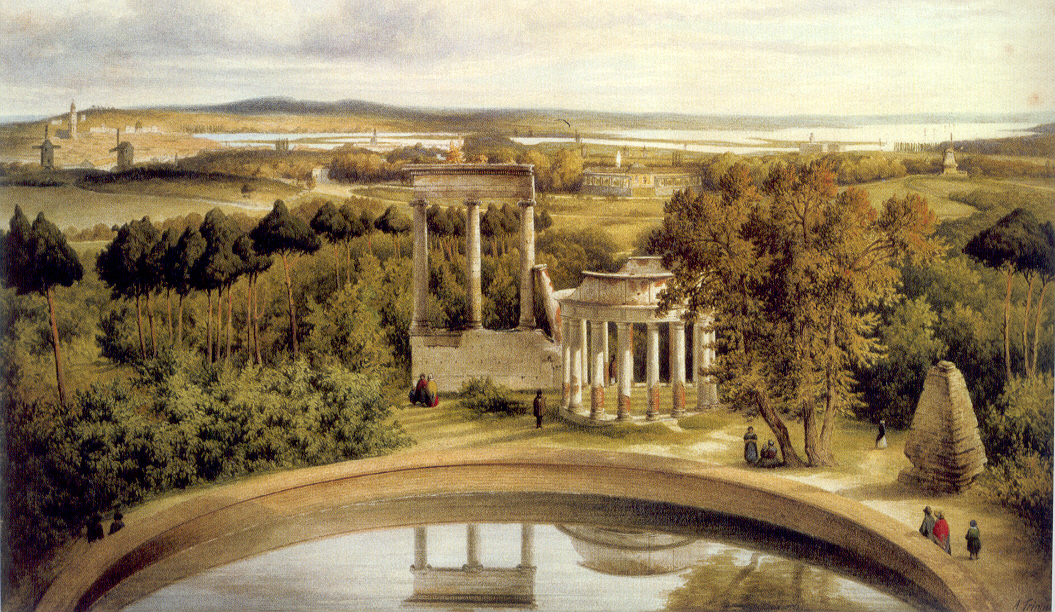
Watercolor by Albert Ludwig Trippel, 1845

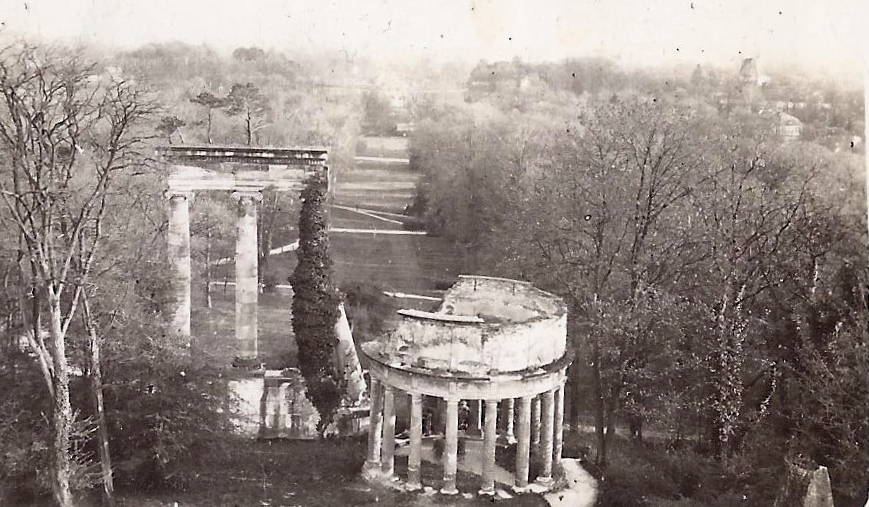
In 1930

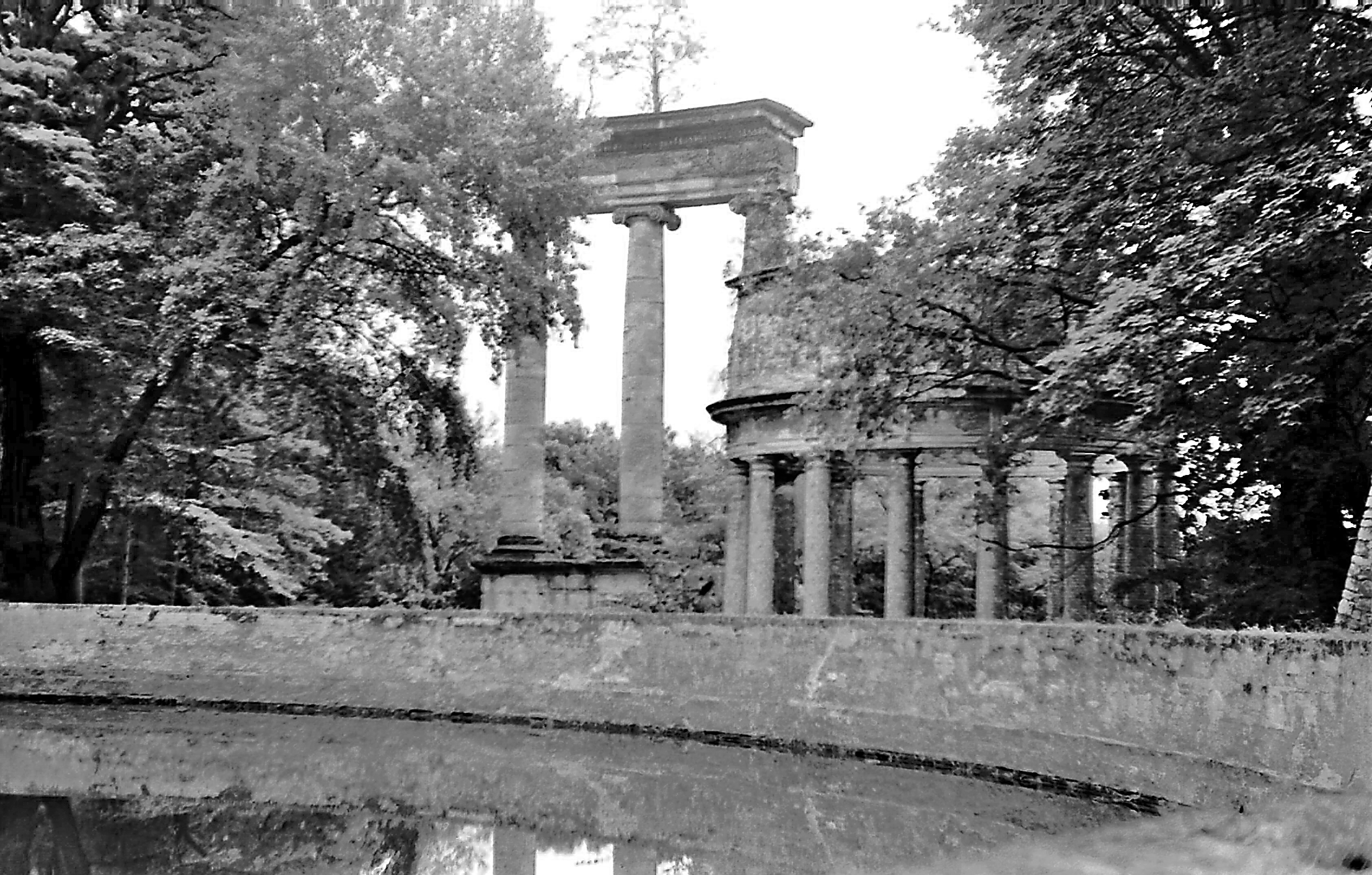
In 1971

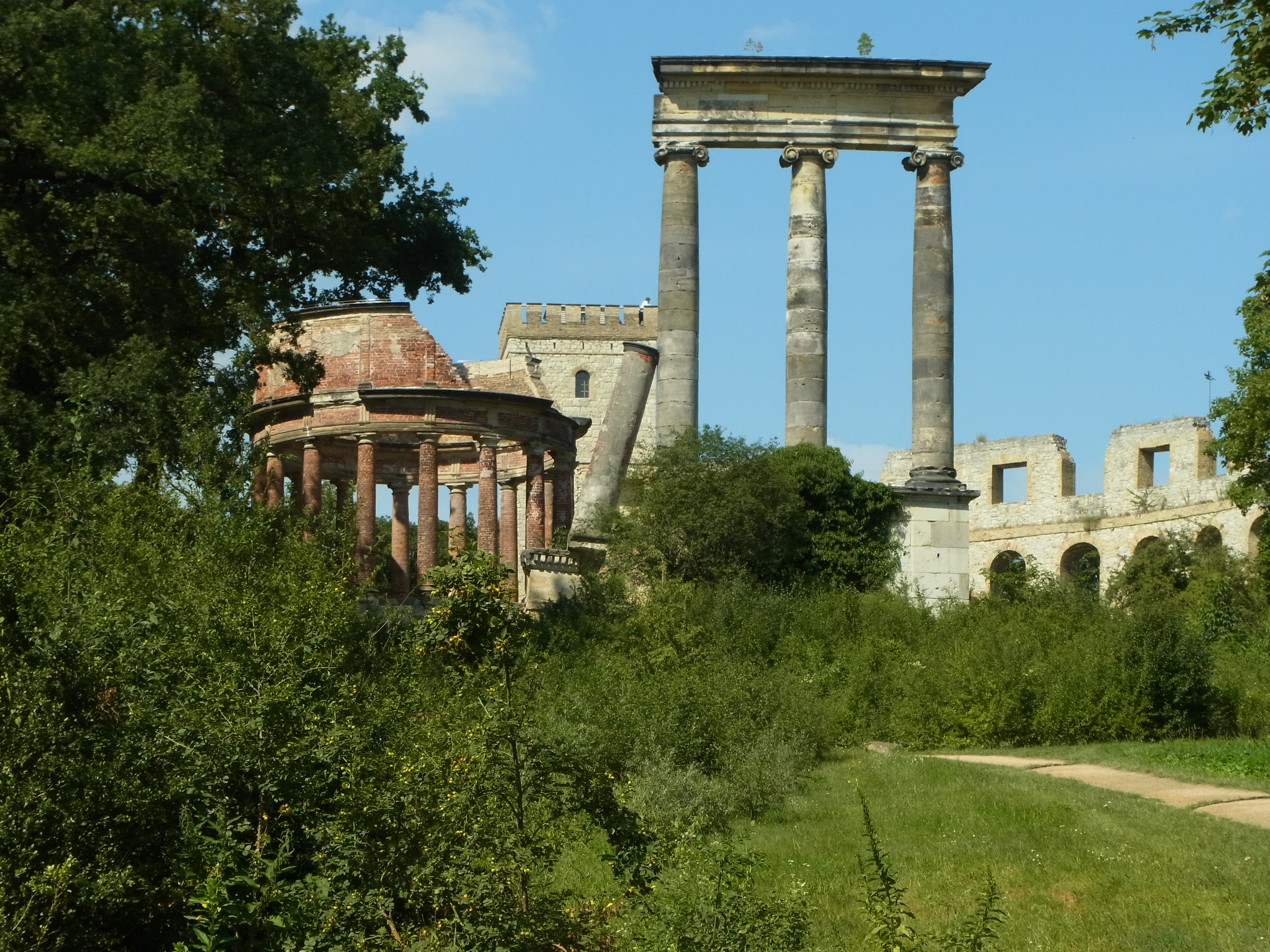
In 2015

== See also ==
- Folly

== General and cited references ==
- Schönle, Andreas (2011). Architecture of Oblivion: Ruins and Historical Consciousness in Modern Russia. DeKalb, Illinois: Northern Illinois University Press. p. 295. ISBN 978-0875806518.
- Simmel, Georg (2012). Lebensanschauung. Vier metaphysische Kapitel (in German). Jazzybee Verlag. p. 424. ISBN 978-3849617110.
