= Alabama Female Institute =

American women's school (1830–1888)

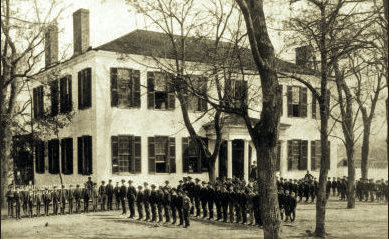
After the Stafford's purchased the property, they converted it into the Stafford School (1876-85), a boys' school.

Alabama Female Institute (Sims' Female Academy; Tuscaloosa Female Academy; 1829-1873) was one of the earliest educational institutions for women organized in Alabama. It opened in Tuscaloosa, in the fall of 1829, as "Sims' Female Academy". In 1831, it became the "Tuscaloosa Female Academy". The name change to Alabama Female Institute occurred in 1833, and this school was chartered in 1835. It continued to operate until 1873. (Note: The property continued to operate as a school in the ensuing years. The Staffords operated it as boys' school, and after they sold it, it was as a public school until 1955.)

== Precursor organizations ==
=== Sims' Female Academy ===
In 1829, Edward Sims, a business man, ardent Methodist, and a strong advocate of higher education of women, built a large brick house which he offered to the Methodist Conference for an academy for girls as long as the Conference would keep a school in it. A school called "Sims' Female Academy" was opened in the building in October 1829. Ninety pupils were enrolled the first session. There were five teachers. Armand P. Pfister, the author of the "University March," and Grand Secretary of all the Masonic orders in Alabama, was instructor in music.

On January 15, 1830, a charter for this school was approved by the Legislature of Alabama. This charter, after granting the usual judiciary powers, and declaring the corporation perpetual, and giving the trustees power to establish and break the common seal at will, also empowered the trustees to make such by-laws as would not be repugnant to the laws and constitution of the State and of the U.S. It provided that the trustees should not at any time hold property of greater value than US$20,000; and provided no religious tenets to the exclusion of others should be taught. This charter also prohibited the trustees from dealing in notes, or bills of exchange, or exercising banking powers.

There is a strange inconsistency between Mr. Sims's avowed intention of establishing a Methodist academy and the positive statement in the charter that the tenets of any one church should not be taught to the exclusion of others. It is certain that Mr. Sims was disappointed, and the Sims's Academy passed out of existence in 1830, after continuing only one year.

It is uncertain whether the Methodist Conference ever accepted Mr. Sims's offer, but if it did, its connection with the school very soon ceased. As this school continued for so short a time, little is known of it, no records are extant, nothing to show what the curriculum was, except the name "Academy." When Mr. Sims decided to close the school, he sold the building to Dr. Leach, and the building became known as "Leach Place".

=== Tuscaloosa Female Association ===
About the same time the Sims's Academy was chartered, at the session of the Legislature of 1830, there was chartered an association called "The Tuscaloosa Female Association", whose object was the "promotion of female education, and a higher standard of morals in the community." This association thought an undenominational school preferable to a denominational school. Mr. Sims did not oppose their plans, but to some extent cooperated with this association in establishing the Tuscaloosa Female Academy, which was chartered January 15, 1831.

The first provision of this charter was: "President and trustees and stockholders of the association founded in Tuscaloosa, in 1830, are hereby created a body politic and corporate in law, with powers to establish in Tuscaloosa a female academy according to any plan and system they may see fit. They may have a common seal, changeable at pleasure." The usual powers concerning acquisition and disposal of property were granted, and the following additional powers: "And finally to do all such things, by themselves, their agents, trustees or servants as may be necessary and proper to carry into effect said Female Academy. The affairs of the corporation are to be transacted by the president and the trustees. Corporation property to be exempt from taxation."

As it was not uncommon to call in the aid of the lottery for educational and civic purposes in that era, the charter also stated: "Said corporation shall have power to raise by lottery in one or more classes upon such scheme as they may devise, any sum or sums of money not exceeding fifty thousand dollars ($50,000), to be applied to the use of said Academy." Having granted this power it was only consistent that they should make the following prohibition: "Said Academy shall be purely literary and scientific; and trustees are prohibited from the adoption of any system of education which shall provide for the inculcation of the peculiar tenets or doctrine of any religious denomination."

The trustees, thus granted almost unlimited powers, and provided with a lottery, indulged in "great expectations." In the Tuscaloosa Gazette of September 10, 1830, under heading, "Tuscaloosa Female Academy," A. Ready, Esq., secretary of the board of trustees, made the following announcement:—

"A union between the 'Tuscaloosa Female Educational Society' and ' Sims's Academy' has been effected. The first session of the Tuscaloosa Female Academy commenced on Friday, September 6, 1830, under management of Miss Brewer, Miss Howe, and Mrs. Robinson. Mr. A. Pfister and Mrs. Patrick have charge of the music department. The board is making arrangements for the erection of a suitable edifice."

=== Tuscaloosa Female Academy ===
The Sims' Female Academy having merged into the Tuscaloosa Female Academy, the latter school became organized August 1, 1831, and was presided over by the wife of A. M. Robinson, Esq., in the building known in Tuscaloosa as the Eddins place.

In 1831, Mrs. Mary I. Kinner became principal, a position she held for some years. The legislature of 1830–31 incorporated the academy, exempted its property from taxation, and authorized it to raise US$50,000 by lottery. A literary society was organized in 1831. In 1832, the school had a library of 400 volumes.

This beginning was a favorable augury for the success of the school. Music was a great attraction, as every one was anxious for his daughter to have a musical education. Mr. Pfister had a favorable reputation as a music teacher, and he also taught French, which was another popular study.

Notwithstanding the favorable conditions under which the academy began its career, for some unexplained reason, it did not meet the expectations of its friends and they agreed to promote the establishment of the Alabama Female Institute, the trustees of the Tuscaloosa Female Academy having made extensive preparation for maintaining their school.

== Alabama Female Institute ==
=== History ===
The friends of this school proposed to raise the standard of education for girls, to extend the curriculum, and to establish a school of collegiate grade. The Alabama Female Institute was the heir of the Tuscaloosa Female Academy, and thus owned large buildings and a suitable equipment for the departments of music, art, and natural science, as well as a boarding department. The school opened November, 1833, with the new name, Alabama Female Institute, and with Rev. Wm. H. Williams as principal. Courses of study were offered in English, history, geography, philosophy, mathematics, chemistry and music, and diplomas were awarded on the completion of the prescribed work. A boarding department was maintained. Among other ideals, the institution sought to develop the moral and physical, as well as the intellectual life of the students.

The school was chartered on January 9, 1835. This charter empowered the trustees to grant such rewards and confer such honors on graduates as might be deemed expedient, and conferred the usual powers relating to purchase and disposal of property, but made no stipulation as to amount of property. The merging of one school into another seems to have been authorized by the Legislature, for one section of the charter granted to the Alabama Female Institute reads as follows: "The lots, grounds, and buildings erected by the trustees of the Tuscaloosa Female Academy now the property of the trustees named in this charter, together with all other buildings they may erect or grounds they may purchase for the exclusive use of the said female institution, shall be exempt from taxation whatever."

It is almost certain that the curricula of the first and second were nearly identical, and the teachers the same for both, therefore the character of the schools could have had little to do with the change. However, the institute was very popular and quite successful as to numbers. According to an old catalogue, 1836, only three years after its commencement, there were 10 teachers connected with the school, and 184 pupils; 60 in the primary department and 124 in the advanced department.

It was the original intention of the founders of the State University to establish a "branch of the University for female education," but this intention was never put into effect. However, a few years after the establishment of the Alabama Institute the regents of the university decided to extend the advantages of the university to this school, by allowing its classes to attend such lectures of the professors of the university as the principal of the school should select, especially those lectures on natural science and mathematics.

=== Administration ===
The initial trustees were John F. Wallis, James H. Dearing, Peter Martin, John O. Cummins, William H. Williams, John J. Webster, Wiley J. Dearing and H. C. Kidder. The trustees of the Institute for the year ending July 14, 1836, were Hon. Peter Martin, president; Wiley J. Dearing, secretary; John O. Cummins, treasurer; John F. Wallace, James H. Dearing, H. C. Kidder, William H. Williams-just the same, with the exception of John J. Webster, who had retired, as the trustees named in the charter, January 9, 1835.

The first principal of this school was Rev. W. H. Williams; his principal teachers were Miss Maria Belle Brooks (afterward Mrs. Stafford) and Miss Abby Fitch (afterward Mrs. Searcy).

One of the successors of Mr. Williams was Miss Brooks, a native of New Hampshire and a graduate of Mount Holyoke College. After teaching some years, she married Prof. S. R. Stafford, of the University of Alabama. The school attained a high degree of excellence under her direction. It enjoyed the rare advantage of having the professors of the university as lecturers.

In 1842, Professor and Mrs. Caroline Lee Hentz took charge of the school. In 1852, Miss Lavinia Moore was principal and the assistant teachers of the collegiate department were Miss Mary W. Humphreys, Miss Martha A. Inge, and Miss Sarah W. Bigelow.

Professor and Mrs. Stafford again became principals in 1856. A few years later, they associated with themselves, Mrs. W. C. Richardson, and Mrs. R. E. Rodes, widow of General Rodes. They retained charge of the Institute without interruption, except during a few months while Tuscaloosa was occupied by Federal troops, until Professor Stafford's death. Mrs. Stafford continued in charge until 1888, when she sold the property to the city of Tuscaloosa for public school purposes and left the State.

=== Legacy ===
The Alabama Department of Archives and History holds the institution's catalogs. The University of Alabama holds other records.
