= Fauquier White Sulphur Springs =

Resort area in northern Virginia, USA

- Resort
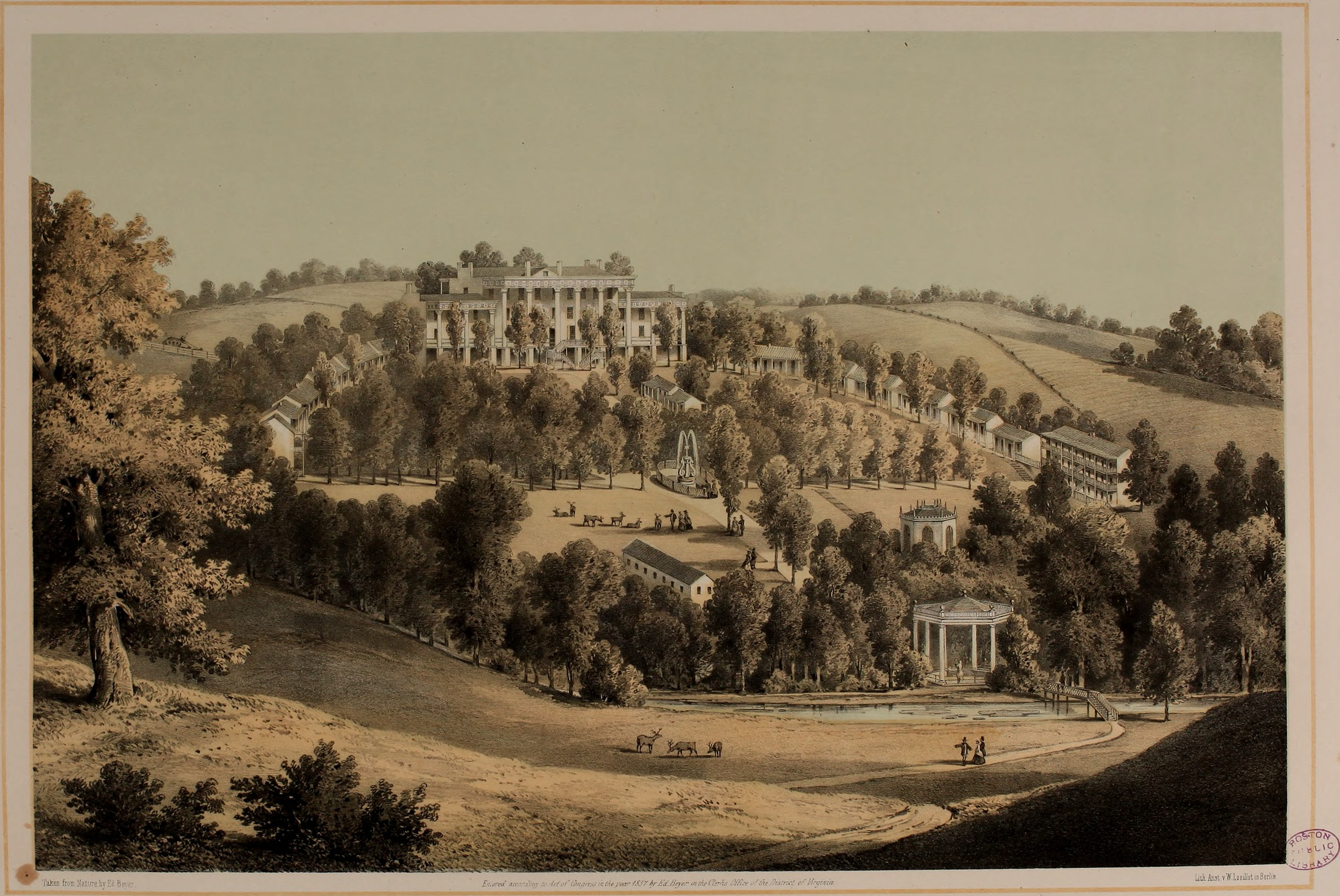
- An image of the Fauquier White Sulphur Springs resort before the American Civil War.

- Location within the state of Virginia
- Coordinates: 38.805°N 77.675°W
- Country: United States
- State: Virginia
- County: Fauquier

Fauquier White Sulphur Springs was a resort area located in Fauquier County, Virginia. Established in the 19th century, it was renowned for its mineral springs, which were purported to cure many diseases. The resort was popular for a time with influential governmental figures.

An 1888 pamphlet published by the proprietors listed a large number of diseases the water of the springs was supposed to cure:

The Spring is a chalybeated sulphur water, alterative, diuretic and tonic, and for many years has been known to be particularly beneficial in the varied forms of Dyspepsia, Diseases of the Bowels, Liver and other Organs of Digestion, such as Chronic Catarrh of Stomach, Constipation, Chronic Diarrhœa, Jaundice, and all those errors of secretion of digestion produced by a residence in a miasmatic climate. Its diuretic properties are most happily shown in Diseases of the Urinary Organs and Dropsical Affections, such as Albuminuria, Diabetis, Chronic Catarrh of the Bladder, and all Dropsical Swellings. Its alterative and tonic effects are most marked in the large class of disorders due to Anemia (impovishment [sic] of the blood) and in female diseases when associated with Anemia, such as Amenorrhœa, Dysmenorrhœa, Leucorrhœa, etc. In that nervous condition known as Neurasthenia, or more popularly loss of nerve power, from over work or other causes, its action has been wonderfully prompt and permanent.

1888 edition of a promotional pamphlet describing the springs.

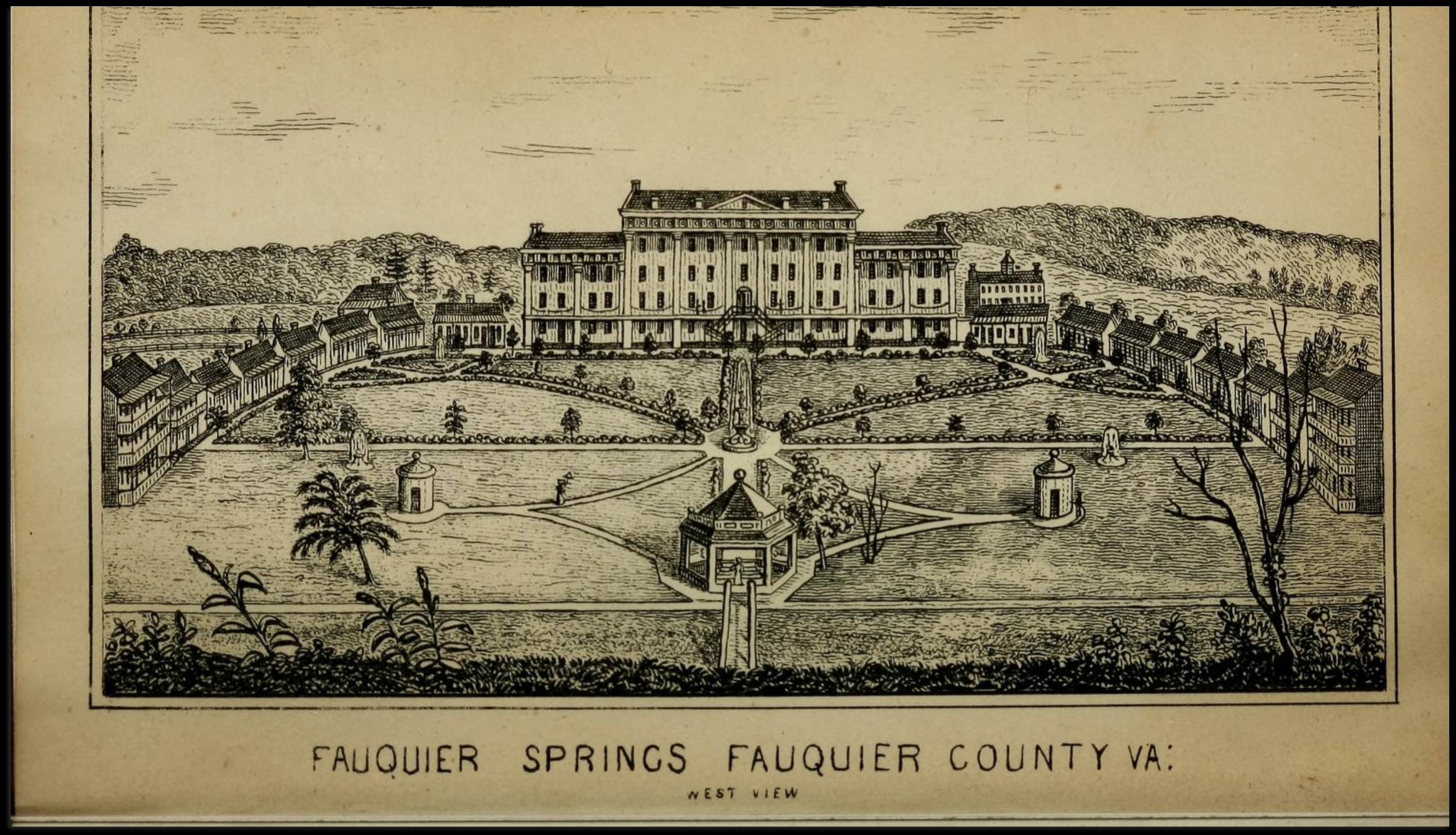
Drawing from the frontispiece of Six Weeks in Fauquier, depicting the grounds as they would have appeared in 1839.

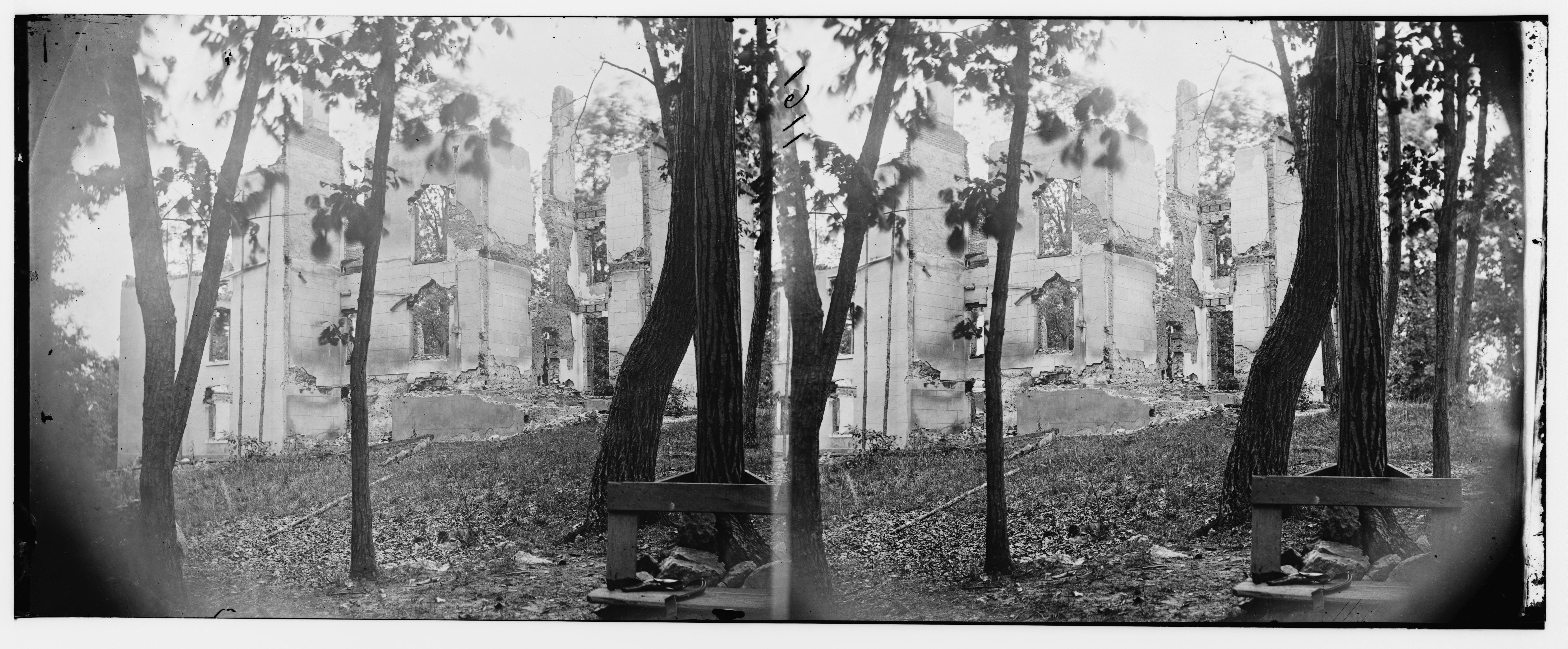
A Stereograph of the ruins of the Fauquier White Sulphur Springs Hotel

== During the American Civil War ==
During the American Civil War, the area served variously as a camp and hospital for Confederate and Union troops. Despite its historical significance and popularity, the resort eventually declined.

== Mary Chesnut's Diary ==
Mary Chesnut, now well-known as a diarist during the American Civil War, recounts several of her visits to the springs in her published diary. She describes the comings and goings of social elites of Confederate society. These included her traveling companion Henry Percy Brewster, an influential Texan lawyer, and John Archibald Campbell, a former U.S. Supreme Court Justice from Alabama who had resigned his seat when the Confederacy seceded.

The springs remained in a resort mode during the war. A chapter of her diary records her visit to the springs on July 6–11, 1861. Chesnut described how many visitors continued to make use of the springs:

July 7th.—This water is making us young again. How these men enjoy the baths.

Nonetheless, there was considerable fear of espionage and encroaching war. She describes close encounters with suspected Union spies:

An antique female with every hair curled and frizzed is said to be a Yankee spy. She sits opposite us.

And the sounds of the guns of war in the distance, or else the fear of guns:

Mrs. Preston's maid Maria has a way of rushing in – "Don't you hear the cannon?" We fly to the windows, lean out to our waists, pull all the hair away from our ears, but can not hear it. Lincoln wants four hundred millions of money and men in proportion. Can he get them? He will find us a heavy handful. Midnight. I hear Maria's guns.

== Temporary Residence of Virginia Legislature ==
In 1849, an outbreak of cholera in Richmond led to the entirety of the Virginia legislature being displaced to Fauquier White Sulphur Springs, the only time that legislative body met outside of Richmond:

The General Assembly has met here every year up to the present (2019) excepting only 1849 when a cholera epidemic in the Tidewater led to the decision to meet elsewhere that spring. They convened on June 1 in the ballroom of the luxurious Fauquier White Sulphur Springs Hotel near Warrenton. While cholera raged downriver and while economy-minded newspaper editors fumed, the legislators had a splendid opportunity to combine business with pleasure.
