= Carr–Burdette College =

Women's college in Texas, US (1894–1929)

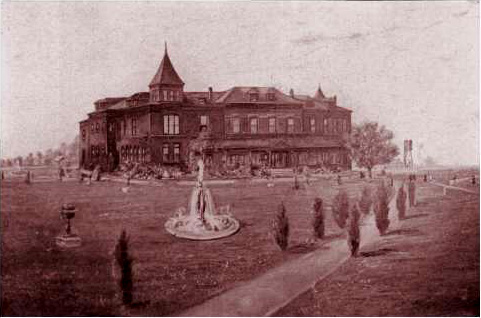
- Carr-Burdette College, 1904
- Active: January 1894–1929
- Founders: Oliver Anderson Carr, Mattie F. Myers Carr
- Location: Sherman, Texas, U.S.

Carr–Burdette College was a private women's college located in Sherman, Texas, that operated from January 1894 to 1929.

== History ==
O. A. Carr (Oliver Anderson Carr) and his spouse Mattie F. Myers Carr founded and opened Carr–Burdette College in 1894 as a preparatory school and junior college. Mattie Carr generated revenue for the school trust by selling lots in Sherman, Texas for $200. It started with a single, large brick building on an eight-acre site. Mattie Carr acted at the school's director until her death in 1907, when the Christian Church in Sherman assumed this role. The school operated through 1929.

The school property was sold in April 1939, and the buildings destroyed.

== See also ==
- List of current and historical women's universities and colleges
