= Elizabeth College (Virginia) =

Women's college in North Carolina and Virginia, United States

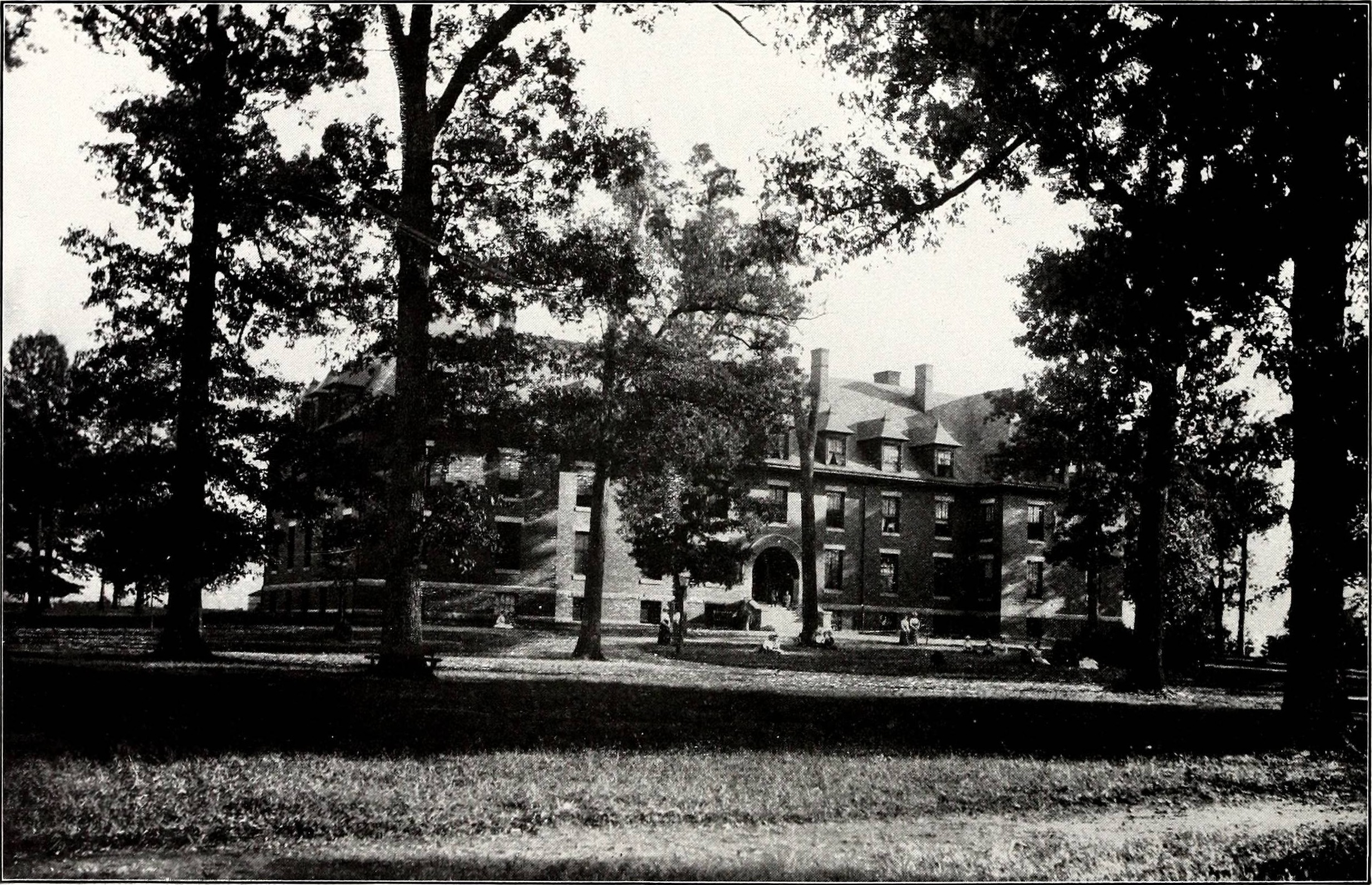
- Type: Private
- Active: 1896–1922
- Location: Charlotte, North Carolina, U.S.

Elizabeth College was a private Lutheran women's college in Charlotte, North Carolina, and Salem, Virginia, that operated between 1896 and 1922.

== History ==
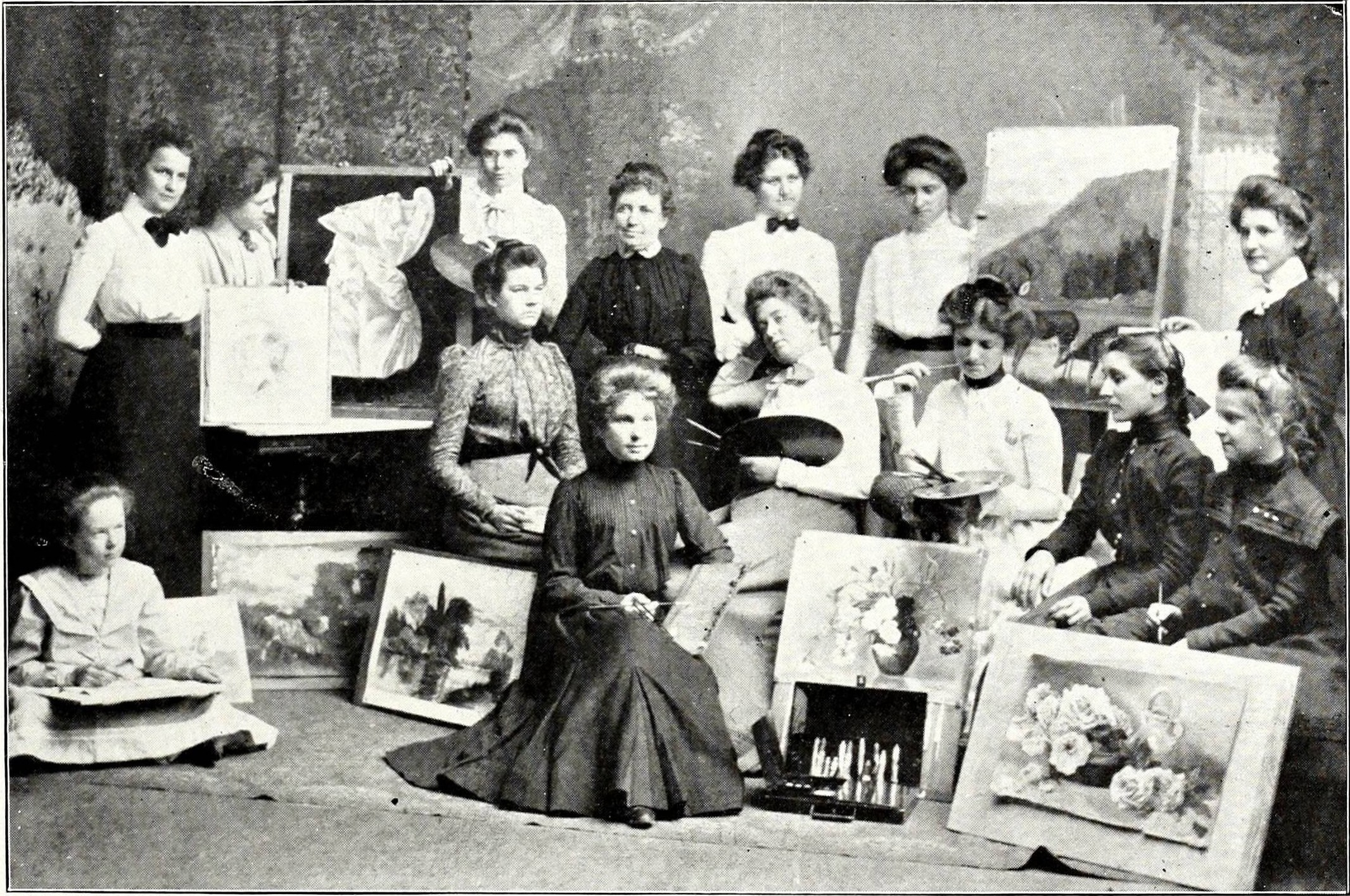
An Elizabeth College art class in 1901.

Elizabeth, named after the wife of the earliest sponsor, was originally located in Charlotte where it operated alongside the Gerard Conservatory of Music. The college moved to Salem in 1915, when it absorbed Roanoke Women's College, a Lutheran women's college founded in Salem in 1912. The merger was arranged by Elizabeth's president, Dr. Charles B. King, who had fond memories of his education at Roanoke College, a Lutheran men's college, in Salem.

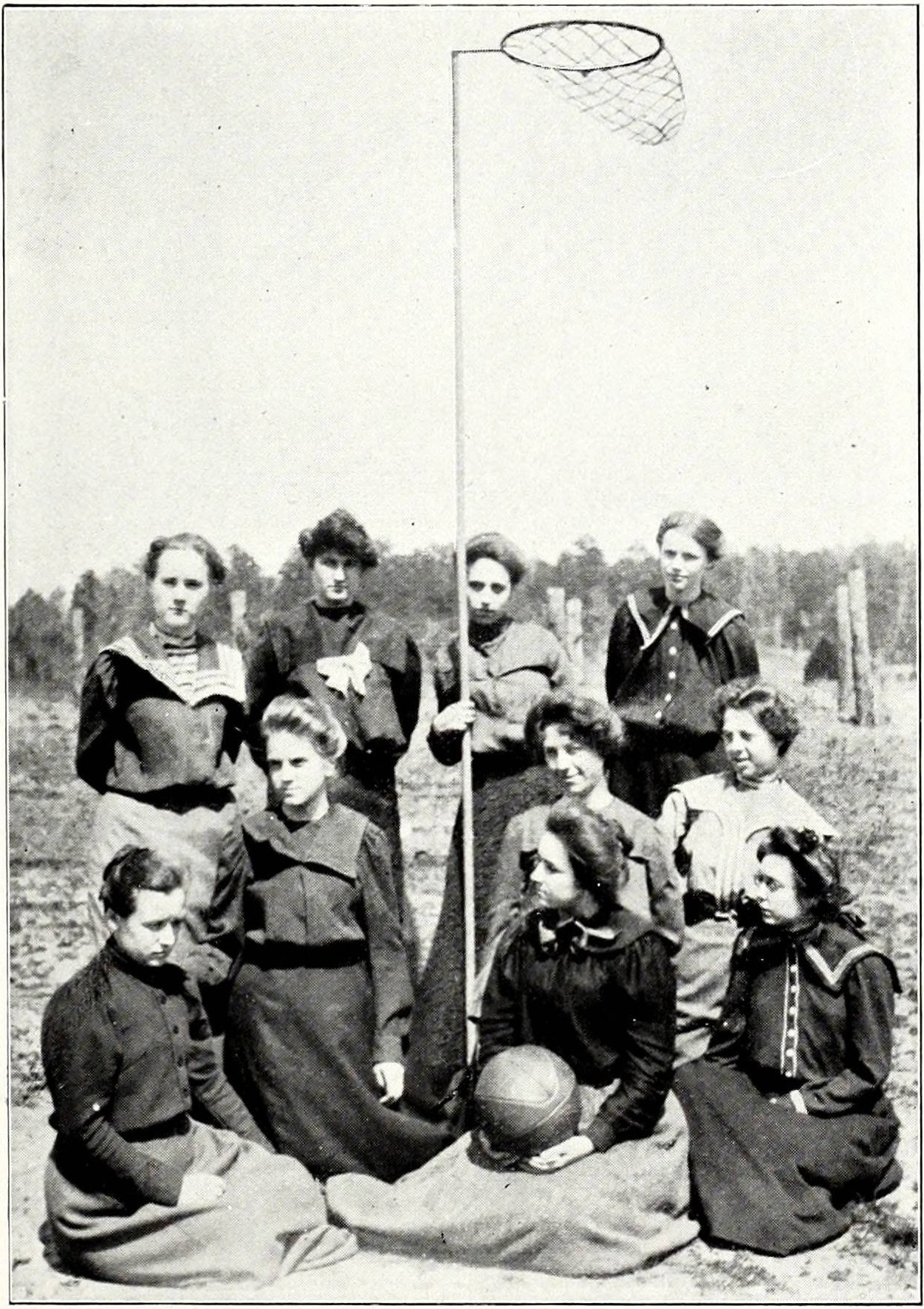
Elizabeth College basketball club, 1901.

Although it was a general liberal arts college, Elizabeth emphasized music. The college was Victorian in nature, though the women attending did have a basketball team. The students socialized primarily with the students from nearby Roanoke College, then all-male. It was known as Dear Old Betsy by its students, some of whom came from as far as Indiana.

=== Destruction ===
The campus burned under suspicious circumstances in December 1921. Elizabeth students finished the spring term at Roanoke College before their own institution closed for good in 1922. Even though it was all-male (Roanoke College did not become coeducational until 1930), Roanoke adopted Elizabeth's alumnae and holds their records.

=== Subsequent use ===
In Charlotte, the original college campus was used for Presbyterian Hospital until 1980, when the buildings were razed. A placard outside the hospital recognized the land's former occupants. In Salem, the land was given to the Lutheran Children's Home of the South, an orphanage that operated from 1927 until the 1980s using several large brick buildings constructed after the Elizabeth fire. Roanoke College purchased the area in 1984; renamed "Elizabeth campus". Two miles (3.2 km) from Roanoke's main campus, it is the site of athletic fields and residence halls.

== See also ==
- List of current and historical women's universities and colleges
