= MUW Alumnae Association =

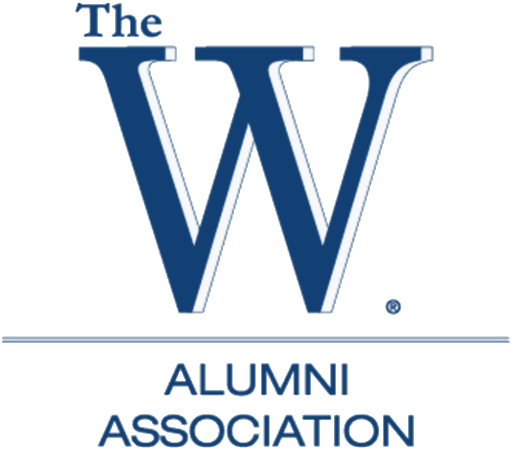
- Formation: 1889; 137 years ago
- Type: Alumni organization
- Location: Columbus, MI, U.S.
- Affiliations: Mississippi University for Women
- Website: muw.edu/alumni-association

MUW Alumnae Association is the former name of the original and historic organization for the alumni of Mississippi University for Women. The alumni association operated under the name "Mississippi's First Alumnae Association" until merging with the MUW Alumni Association in 2011.

== History ==
The university's alumnae association was officially created in 1889 with the graduation of the first class from the university. The responsibility of the original organization was to (1) Promote School Loyalty (2) Maintain Class Ties (3) Support the scholarship loan program, and (4) To coordinate alumnae scholarship gifts. The first full-time alumnae office was established in 1925 for the Alumnae Secretary. This office was also responsible for coordinating the Alumnae Bulletin, homecoming activities, local chapter organizations, and fund raising and recruiting efforts.

== Conflict ==
The relationship between Mississippi University for Women and its alumni became complicated when the former university president, Claudia Limbert, announced her decision to disaffiliate from the 117-year-old MUW Alumnae Association. Though the formal disaffiliation began on February 1, 2007 and went into effect on April 2, 2007, the chain of events that lead to this break-up started several years ago.

Upon her installation as president, Limbert placed the administration of the MUW Alumnae Association under the Vice President of Institutional Advancement. Prior to this change, the Director of Alumni Affairs answered directly to the President. In 2002, Limbert publicly considered changing the name of Mississippi University for Women so that it did not include the word "Women" in the title after a marketing survey suggested that the school's name made it unclear who could and could not attend. One month after that announcement, Limbert announced her decision to cancel the MUW Athletic program after a tornado destroyed the athletics building. The existing MUW Alumnae Association publicly expressed their displeasure related to these decisions.

In 2006, Limbert publicly demoted the Director of Alumni Affairs and fired the Assistant Director of Alumni Affairs for sharing confidential donor information with members of the Alumnae Association. This action came after Limbert seized computers and records in the Alumni Affairs office. Evidence uncovered in the University's investigation of the alumni office led not only to personnel decisions but also demonstrated the need to define more precisely the relationship between the University and the alumnae association.

Also in 2006, the Board of Directors for the State of Mississippi Institute of Higher Learning announced a new requirement that all organizations such as alumni associations, athletic support organizations, foundations, etc. have a formal affiliation agreement with their university. The existing alumnae board tried to negotiate a compromise to establish new bylaws under their affiliation agreement with the university, however the university, after extending the appointed deadline once, ended negotiations and the president appointed her own Alumni Advisory Committee.

As a result, on March 29, 2007 members of the National Executive Board of the MUWAA filed suit in the Lowndes County Chancery Court seeking to stop the disaffiliation. The National Executive Board of the MUWAA is represented pro bono by Julie Hussey, an attorney with the San Diego, Calif., law firm DLA Piper DLA Piper and an MUW alumna.

On November 20, 2008, the Mississippi State Supreme Court determined that Mississippi University for Women President Claudia Limbert had the legal right to terminate the university's relationship with its former alumnae association, overturning Lowndes County Chancellor Dorothy Colom's decision from September 28, 2007. The state court ruled the judge unconstitutionally interfered with the Mississippi Board of Trustees of State Institutions of Higher Learning's authority to govern universities and reaffirmed the right of the IHL board and state university presidents to determine how affiliated alumni associations operate.

The MUW Alumnae Association Board of Directors voted to approve a reunification plan to join the MUW Alumni Association in 2011.
