= Women's colleges in the Southern United States =

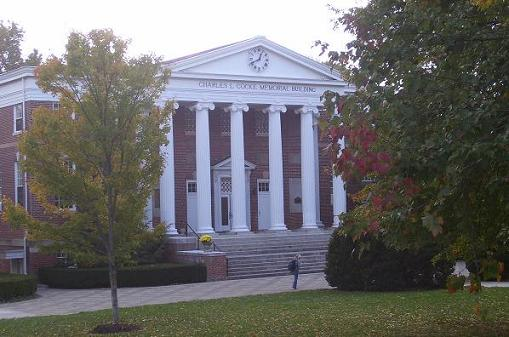
Hollins University

Women's colleges in the Southern United States are undergraduate, bachelor's degree–granting institutions in the American South with student populations that consist exclusively or almost exclusively of women. Many began as girls' schools or academies. Salem College is the oldest female educational institution in the South and Wesleyan College is the first specifically established as a college for women, closely followed by Judson College in 1838. Some schools, such as Salem College, offer coeducational courses at the graduate level.

== History ==
Many American educational institutions for women were established in the early nineteenth century as schools for girls, academies, or female seminaries. In the usage of the era, academies were schools that provided the rough equivalent of a modern secondary education, while female seminaries were secular institutions that trained teachers. The Women's College Coalition noted that: "Seminaries educated women for the only socially acceptable occupation: teaching. Only unmarried women could be teachers. Many early women's colleges began as female seminaries and were responsible for producing an important corps of educators."

The abolition of slavery in the wake of the American Civil War prompted the establishment of institutions for the education of newly emancipated Black women and girls. The development of Jim Crow laws in the late nineteenth century meant that emerging Black women's colleges developed on a separate, parallel track alongside those for White women. Today, these institutions are classified as historically black colleges and universities (HBCU).

== Historically Black women's colleges (HBCU) ==
Educational Institution	Location	Status	Current enrollment (if female institution)	Opened door to students	Collegiate charter
Scotia Seminary	Concord, North Carolina	Coeducational; Barber-Scotia College since 1954; Lost accreditation in 2004	N.A.	1867 (female seminary); 1870 (chartered); 1916 (Scotia Women's College); 1930 (Merged with Barber Memorial College)	1870 (Women's college granted first degree 1874)
Bennett College	Greensboro, North Carolina	Women's college	780	1873 (coeducational)	1889 (Becomes women's college in 1926)
Mount Hermon Female Seminary	Clinton, Mississippi	Closed in 1924	N.A.	1875	Secured in 1873
Spelman College	Atlanta, Georgia	Women's college	2,290	1881 (as Atlanta Baptist; Female Seminary)	1924 (First college degrees awarded in 1901)
Tillotson College	Austin, Texas	1881-1926 (Coeducational); 1926–1935 (Women's college) 1935–present (Coeducational); Huston–Tillotson University	N.A.	1881 (coeducational)	1926 (Women's college)
Hartshorn Memorial College	Richmond, Virginia	Merged with Virginia Union University in 1932.	N.A.	1883	March 13, 1884 (First college degrees awarded in 1885.)
Mary Allen Seminary	Crockett, Houston County, Texas	Coeducational in 1933	N.A.	1886	N.A.
Barber Memorial College	Anniston, Alabama	Coeducational; Barber-Scotia College since 1954; Lost accreditation in 2004	N.A.	1896; 1930 (Merged with Scotia Women's College)	1946 (Women's college)

== Additional current women's colleges in the South ==
Institutions are listed chronologically by the date at which they opened their doors to students. Former names are in italics.

- 1772: Little Girls' School (now Salem College): Originally established as a primary school, it later developed as an academy (high school), and finally a college. It is the oldest female educational establishment that is still a women's college, and the oldest female institution in the Southern United States.
- 1833: Columbia Female Academy (now Stephens College): Founded as an academy (high school), it later became a college. It is the second-oldest female educational establishment that is still a women's college. Missouri is in the Upper South. It was settled by planters along the Mississippi River.
- 1839: Georgia Female College (now Wesleyan College): This is the oldest (and the first) school to be founded (chartered in 1836) as a college for women.
- 1842: Valley Union Seminary (now Hollins University): Established in Roanoke, Virginia as a coeducational school, it became a school for women in 1852, and was renamed Hollins Institute in 1855. As the curriculum was developed, it was renamed Hollins College in 1911, and Hollins University in 1998.
- 1873: Bennett College : Founded in Greensboro, North Carolina as a coeducational school, it became a women's college in 1926.
- 1878: Georgia Baptist Female Seminary (now the Brenau University Women's College): Despite its name, the college was never formally associated with any church or religious group. Founded in Gainesville, Georgia, it became Brenau College in 1900 and Brenau University in 1992. The university still boasts its robust Women's College on its historic Gainesville campus today, educating women to be, as its motto states, "as gold refined by fire."
- 1881: Atlanta Baptist Female Seminary (now Spelman College): In 1924 it was the second historically black female institution to receive its collegiate charter, making it the second oldest historically black women's college.
- 1889: Decatur Female Seminary (now Agnes Scott College): Founded in Decatur, Georgia, it became the Agnes Scott Institute in 1890, and Agnes Scott College in 1906.
- 1891: Baptist Female University (now Meredith College): Founded in Raleigh, North Carolina, it became the Baptist University for Women in 1891, and Meredith College in 1909.
- 1901: Sweet Briar College: founded in Sweet Briar, Virginia; announced on March 3, 2015, that it was closing at the end of the 2014–15 school year. The alumnae, current students, and friends of the college took to the courts to battle the administrators' decision. Before the college officially closed, the Virginia Attorney General declared on June 20 that the college is to remain open. Sweet Briar successfully re-opened for the 2015-16 school year and remains open.

== Additional former and defunct women's schools ==
- 1814: Louisburg Female Academy (now Louisburg College): Founded in North Carolina; Louisburg Female College, founded in 1857. Later merged with Franklin Male Academy.
- 1818: Elizabeth Female Academy: First female educational institution in Mississippi; it closed in 1843.
- 1819: Nazareth Academy (later Nazareth College, now Spalding University): Founded as an academy (high school) in Bardstown, Kentucky, it moved to the nearby community of Nazareth in 1822, and first received authority to grant degrees in 1829. The Sisters of Charity of Nazareth, which has operated the institution from its creation, opened a branch campus in Louisville in 1920. The school became Spalding College in 1969, moved all instruction to Louisville in 1971, admitted its first men in 1973, and became a university in 1984.
- 1821: Clinton Female Seminary: Georgia. Forerunner to Wesleyan College.
- 1827: Knoxville Female Academy: Rechartered as the East Tennessee Female Institute in 1846, which granted "Mistress of Polite Literature" degrees; closed in 1911.
- 1828: South Carolina Female Institute: The word "Collegiate" was added to its charter in 1835. It closed in 1867.
- 1831: LaGrange Female Academy (now LaGrange College): Founded in LaGrange, Georgia, it became LaGrange Female College in 1851, and coeducational in 1953.
- 1835: Livingston Female Academy and State Normal College (now University of West Alabama): It became coeducational in 1915.
- 1838: Judson Female Institute (Judson College): Founded in Marion, Alabama, it became Judson College in 1903, it closed in 2021.
- 1839: Farmville Female Seminary Association (now Longwood University): Founded in Farmville, Virginia, it became a four-year college in 1860; it became coeducational in 1976.
- 1841: Asheville Female Seminary: Later renamed Asheville Female College.
- 1842: Fulton Female Academy (now Synodical College): Founded in Fulton, Missouri, it closed in 1928.
- 1842: Augusta Female Seminary (now Mary Baldwin University): Founded in Staunton, Virginia, it was renamed as Mary Baldwin Seminary in 1895, Mary Baldwin College in 1923 after curriculum development, and Mary Baldwin University in 2016. It went coeducational one year later.
- 1846: Greensboro Female College: Charted in 1838 in Greensboro, North Carolina; it is now the coeducational school Greensboro College.
- 1847: Kentucky Female Orphan School (now Midway University): Became fully coeducational in 2016 when it admitted men into its daytime undergraduate program, the last component of the school that remained women-only. The school had offered coeducational evening/weekend and online programs for several years before going fully coed.
- 1851: Tennessee and Alabama Female Institute (later Mary Sharp College): It was the first women's college to grant academic college degrees to women that were the equivalent of those given to men; the college closed due to financial hardship in 1896.
- 1853: Hagerstown Female Seminary (later Kee Mar College): in Hagerstown, Maryland. It closed in 1911.
- 1853: Union Female College, in Oxford, Mississippi
- 1854: Columbia College (Columbia, South Carolina), became coeducational in 2021.
- 1855: Davenport Female College (later Davenport College): Founded in Lenoir, North Carolina. Chartered by the North Carolina General Assembly in 1859. Merged with Greensboro College in 1938.
- 1855: Mansfield Female College: Founded in Mansfield, Louisiana, it is claimed to be the first women's college west of the Mississippi River. Merged with Centenary College of Louisiana in 1930.
- 1857: Athens Female College: Founded in Athens, Tennessee; renamed East Tennessee Wesleyan in 1866. Nowadays Tennessee Wesleyan University.
- 1857: Charlotte Female Institute: Founded in Charlotte, North Carolina; became the coeducational Queens University of Charlotte after World War II.
- 1857: Peace Institute (now William Peace University): Founded in Raleigh, North Carolina; changed name first to Peace College, and then to the current name when it became coeducational in 2012.
- 1865: Ward Seminary for Young Ladies: Founded in Nashville, Tennessee; merged with Belmont College for Young Women in 1913 to form Ward–Belmont College. In 1951, Ward–Belmont was sold to the Tennessee Baptist Convention, under which it became coeducational and its name was shortened to Belmont College (today Belmont University).
- 1867: Scotia Seminary (now Barber–Scotia College): It was the first historically black female institution of higher education established after the American Civil War. It became a women's college in 1916. It became a coeducational school in 1954. It lost its accreditation in 2004.

- 1869: Young's Female College in Thomasville, Georgia, was founded in 1869. It had 15 teachers and 115 students in 1906.
- 1870: Sullins College: Founded in Bristol, VA in 1870, it originally operated a high school as well as a junior college. The high school was discontinued after WW II. The junior college, which offered associate degrees in both liberal arts and fine arts, closed in 1976.
- 1873: Blue Mountain College (now Blue Mountain Christian University): Founded in Northeast Mississippi, it remained focused on women's education until 1956, when a program to train men for church-related vocations was started. In October 2005, the board of trustees voted to make the school co-educational.
- 1875: Mount Hermon Female Seminary: Founded in Clinton, Mississippi, it closed in 1924.
- 1881: Incarnate Word School (now University of the Incarnate Word): Located in San Antonio, Texas and originally chartered as a women's college, it absorbed an all-female secondary school early in its history, adding college classes in 1909. It became coeducational in 1970.
- 1881: Tillotson College: Founded as a coeducational school, it was a women's college from 1926–1935. It became coeducational and has developed as Huston–Tillotson University with additional programs.
- 1883: Belhaven College for Young Ladies (now Belhaven University): Opened in 1894 and located in Jackson, Mississippi. The school became coeducational in 1954.
- 1883: Hartshorn Memorial College founded in Richmond, Virginia. In 1932, it merged with Virginia Union University.
- 1884: Industrial Institute & College (now Mississippi University for Women): It was the first public women's college; became coeducational in 1982 as a result of the Supreme Court's Mississippi University for Women v. Hogan case, but maintained its original name.
- 1886: Mary Allen Seminary : Founded in Crockett, Houston County, Texas. It became coeducational in 1933.
- 1886: H. Sophie Newcomb Memorial College: Became coeducational in 2007 (merged with Tulane University)
- 1889: Converse College: Founded in Spartanburg, South Carolina, became coeducational in 2020. Changed its name a year later when it became a university.
- 1889: Georgia Normal and Industrial College: The coordinate college for Georgia Tech, it granted its first degrees in 1917. After two name changes, the Women's College of Georgia became coeducational in 1967. Three more name changes followed, with the current name of Georgia College & State University adopted in 1996.
- 1890: Belmont College for Young Women: It merged with Ward Seminary for Young Ladies in 1913 to become Ward-Belmont College and later became coeducational.
- 1891: Randolph-Macon Women's College: It become coeducational and changed its name to Randolph College in 2007.
- 1891: North Carolina Women's College: It became the coeducational University of North Carolina at Greensboro in 1963.
- 1896: Alabama Girls Industrial School: Became coeducational (Alabama College) in 1956 and changed its name to University of Montevallo in 1969.
- 1896: Barber Memorial College: Founded in Anniston, Alabama, it merged with Scotia Women's College (formerly Scotia Seminary) in Concord, North Carolina in 1930 to become Barber-Scotia Junior College
- 1905: Florida State College for Women: Founded as the coeducational West Florida Seminary in 1851, it went through four name changes in its first half-century, becoming Florida State College in 1901. The school then became a women's college in 1905. In 1947, it returned to coeducation and adopted its current name of Florida State University.
- 1908: State Normal and Industrial School for Women at Fredericksburg: After changing its name to Mary Washington College (MWC) in 1938, it became the coordinate women's college of The University of Virginia in 1944. MWC was separated from UVA in 1972, two years after both schools became fully coeducational. MWC adopted its current name of the University of Mary Washington in 2004.
- 1908: State Normal and Industrial School for Women at Harrisonburg: Became de facto coeducational in 1946, by which time it was known as Madison College (the school's fourth name), and became officially coeducational in 1966. Adopted its current name of James Madison University in 1976.
- 1921: Villa Madonna College: Founded in Covington, Kentucky as a women's college, but conducted many coeducational classes through an affiliation with the all-male St. Thomas More College. In 1945, Villa Madonna became coeducational when St. Thomas More was merged into it. The school's previous name of Thomas More College was adopted in 1968, the same year it moved to its current campus in Crestview Hills. Thomas More was granted university status in 2018.
- 1925: Mount Saint Joseph College for Women: Founded as a junior college in the rural Daviess County, Kentucky community of Maple Mount, it soon opened a coeducational extension branch in nearby Owensboro. The extension branch eventually became a second campus, although the Maple Mount campus remained all-female. In 1950, Mount Saint Joseph merged its two campuses into a single coeducational institution at the Owensboro site. The following year, the school became Brescia College, and it adopted its current name of Brescia University in 1998.
- 1938: Ursuline College: Located in Louisville, Kentucky, it merged into the previously all-male Bellarmine College, also in Louisville, in 1968. The merged school adopted its current name of Bellarmine University in 2000.

== Coeducation ==
A number of women's colleges have become coeducational, such as H. Sophie Newcomb Memorial College which was dissolved in 2006 as part of the aftermath of widespread damage from Hurricane Katrina in New Orleans the previous year. It merged with Tulane University.

A few historically black women's colleges also adopted coeducation or merged with coordinate universities: Barber-Scotia College in 1954; Tillotson College became coeducational in 1936 and has developed as Huston–Tillotson University; Hartshorn Memorial College merged with Virginia Union University in 1932; and Mary Allen Seminary became coeducational in 1933. Bennett College, founded as a coeducational school, realigned as a women's college in 1926.

Mississippi University for Women changed its single-sex admissions policy to include men in 1982 following the U.S. Supreme Court ruling in Mississippi University for Women v. Hogan. The court found that the university would be in violation of the Fourteenth Amendment's Equal Protection Clause if it denied admission to its nursing program on the basis of gender. The 5-4 opinion was written by Justice O'Connor, who stated that

"In limited circumstances, a gender-based classification favoring one sex can be justified if it intentionally and directly assists members of the sex that is disproportionately burdened." She argued that there are a disproportionate number of women who are nurses, and that denying admission to men "lends credibility to the old view that women, not men, should become nurses, and makes the assumption that nursing is a field for women a self-fulfilling prophecy."

In their dissenting opinions, Justices Harry A. Blackmun, Warren E. Burger, Lewis F. Powell, Jr., and William H. Rehnquist suggested that the result of this ruling would be the elimination of publicly supported single-sex educational opportunities. The ruling did not require the university to change its name to reflect its coeducational status.

In 2006, Randolph-Macon Woman's College announced that it would adopt coeducation and change its name. Former Interim president Ginger H. Worden wrote in September 15, 2006 editorial published in The Washington Post that it was not economically feasible for the college to remain single-sex as young women were no longer interested in attending women's colleges. A number of presidents of women's colleges challenged Worden, arguing that other women's colleges are still doing well and attracting students. They included Agnes Scott College, Columbia College in South Carolina, the Seven Sisters, a separate article from Mount Holyoke College, Simmons College, Sweet Briar College and Hollins University. In addition, there were numerous protests on campus including rallies, blocking administrative offices, mass requests for transfer transcripts, banners all over campus, striking from classes, and participation in quiet protest to highlight lack of student voices in the board of trustees votes.

The non-profit "Preserve Education Choice" (PEC) was founded, composed of students, faculty, and alumnae who are trying to reverse the decision. Two lawsuits were filed by Preserve Educational Choice. On January 23, 2007, both lawsuits were dismissed in Lynchburg Circuit Court. PEC raised enough money to appeal both dismissals, and a group of nine students brought the case to the Virginia Supreme Court. "Richmond lawyer Wyatt B. Durrette Jr. asked the state's high court to grant an appeal of the group's lawsuit." Professor emeritus of Romance languages, Charlotte Stern, published the 24-page letter on the PEC website (with signatures from alumnae, former professors and a former president of Randolph's board of trustees) condemning the decision. Ginger Hill Worden, Interim President, responded to this letter. The Virginia Supreme Court agreed to hear appeals in both the student contract and charitable trust cases. The Court affirmed the trial court's decision in both cases in opinions issued June 6, 2008. The institution was renamed Randolph College on July 1, 2007, when it became coeducational.

More recently, Midway University in Kentucky, which already had coeducational evening, weekend, and online programs, became fully coeducational when it admitted men to its daytime undergraduate program for the first time at the start of the 2016–17 school year. When announcing this change, the school's president cited surveys indicating that only about 2% of high school girls wanted to attend a women-only college, and added, "We see this change as strengthening our historic mission to educate women by broadening our reach to that 98 percent of young women who would never consider a women's college."

== See also ==
- List of current and historical women's universities and colleges in the United States
- Timeline of women's colleges in the United States
- Women's colleges in the United States
- Women's College Coalition
- Seven Sisters (colleges)
