= Union Female College (Mississippi) =

Women's college in Oxford, Mississippi, US

- Former name: Oxford Female Academy
- Type: Private single-gender
- Active: 1853–1911
- Religious affiliation: Cumberland Presbyterian Church
- Location: Oxford, Mississippi, United States
- Campus: Urban

Union Female College was a private school for women which operated in Oxford, Mississippi in the United States. Founded in 1838 as the Oxford Female Academy, it came under the control of the Cumberland Presbyterian Church in 1853, and was incorporated as Union Female College. The college closed in 1898. The former college's buildings were destroyed in a fire in 1911.

== History ==
In 1838, a group of Oxford citizens organized a private school to educate girls and young women in the community. It was chartered by the state legislature as the Oxford Female Academy in 1838. The school opened in the fall of 1839, with Charlotte Paine as its first principal. By the end of its first session in December 1839, the school had 34 students. Paine was succeeded by James Weatherby, a Presbyterian minister, who led the school from 1840 to 1844. Under Weatherby's leadership, enrollment continued to grow, reaching 84 students by 1842, with students drawn from three states and from seven Mississippi counties.

Other principals included Samuel Leake Slack from 1844–1847; Cyrus Collins from 1847–1849; A. L. Lewis from 1849–1850, and James H. Viser from 1850–1852. In 1852, Stanford Guthrie Burney, D.D., pastor of Oxford's Cumberland Presbyterian congregation and president of the Mt. Sylvan Academy for boys in western Lafayette County, became principal of the school.

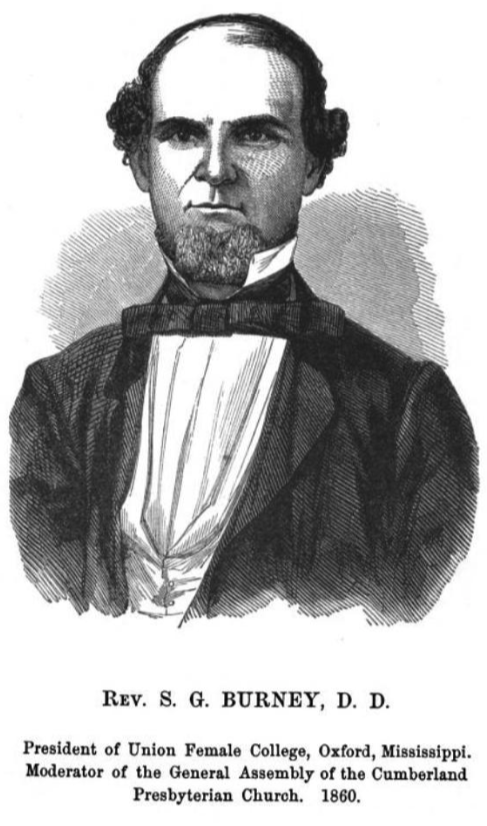
Stanford G. Burney, c. 1860

Between 1851 and 1853, the Synods of Mississippi, Union, and West Tennessee of the Cumberland Presbyterian Church explored options to form two denominational colleges in the region: one for men and one for women. In 1853, the Board of Trustees of the Oxford Female Institute offered to transfer the school and its property to the Cumberland Presbyterian Church on condition that it be used for the synods’ college for women. Citizens of Oxford made other "valuable donations" to entice the members of the synods to locate their new college in Oxford. The efforts to attract the college to Oxford proved successful, and plans were set in motion to cede control of the Oxford Female Institute to the Cumberland Presbyterian Synod.

In the fall of 1853, the church opened Union Female College with Burney as the first president. Union Female College was chartered by the Mississippi legislature on February 4, 1854. Under Burney's leadership, the college "became one of the educational powers of Mississippi". Burney served as president of the college until 1860, when he resigned and became president of Union's Board of Trustees, where he served until 1878.

Faculty president Rev. R. S. Thomas became president of the college in 1860, and served as president until the Civil War forced the school to suspend operations in 1861. In the fall of 1865, the college reopened with Rev. C. H. Bell as its president. In 1873, Bell was replaced by R. J. Guthrie, followed by Rev. J. S. Howard in 1875. Rev. Andrew N. Eshman became president of the college in the fall of 1892.In June 1894, newspapers announced that the Synod of the Cumberland Presbyterian Church had decided to move the college to West Point, Mississippi, changing its name to Southern Female College. The town of West Point provided $10,000 toward the college's relocation, receiving the Cumberland Presbyterian Church's commitment that this would be its only college in Mississippi. Five days later, an article ran in the Oxford Eagle, clarifying that Union Female College would remain open in Oxford under the control of Cumberland Presbyterian Church. Union Female College's alumnae society printed a letter of reassurance to the public and other alumnae in the local paper on August 16, 1894, stating the Union would open for the fall semester.

The college opened for the fall semester on September 1, 1894, with Rev. Alvin S. Maddox of Tennessee as its new president. Meanwhile, construction started on a building for Southern Female College. In October 1894, the Presbyterian Church in Water Valley voted for the move to West Point, suggesting that the issue was still unresolved between the member churches within the Synod. Southern Female College opened with 140 students on December 1, 1894; its president was Andrew N. Eshman, formerly of Union Female College. Coverage of the opening noted that Union Female College had both moved to West Point and remained in Oxford. However, it was later revealed that Eshman had approached West Point after Oxford had not provided funding for his proposed expansion of Union Female College.

At its meeting in May 1895, the general assembly of the Cumberland Presbyterian Church clarified that the Mississippi Synod has ordered Union Female College to relocate to West Point, but the college had continued to operate in Oxford while its closure was appealed by the Cumberland Presbyterians. The general assembly determined that the two colleges were operating under two different charters and found no reason to close Union Female College.

However, Union Female College temporarily closed in late 1896 when Oxford was placed under a quarantine due to a typhoid fever outbreak. In the summer of 1898, when Maddox was out of town promoting the college, a yellow fever outbreak caused town officials to place Oxford under quarantine. Anxious to open the school, Maddox leased a property in Little Rock, Arkansas where he established Little Rock University, later called the Maddox Seminary.

In 1899, the Union Female College had graduated 275 students and was owned and controlled by the Synod of Mississippi. John Wesley Malone, a Methodist minister, served as college president between 1899 and 1902. The college's enrollment declined in the early 20th century as women were allowed to attend universities. Cumberland Presbyterian Church sold the campus to Mr. Wyatt and Mr. Hurst, who opened the University Training School. On the morning of Tuesday, April 25, 1911, a fire started on the third floor of the main building, destroying it in less than two hours. It was considered a total loss. Union Training School finished its session on the University of Mississippi campus, but then closed.

== Campus ==
The ten-acre campus of Oxford Female Academy (and, later Union Female College) included Lots 45, 46, 47, 51, and 52 of the original town plan of Oxford. The original school building was described as "a little log and frame building." In 1847, the log and frame building was sold and moved and the school built a two-story brick building "presenting very much the appearance of an ordinary dwelling house." It was thirty feet square in size. Other dependency buildings were also constructed on the campus, such as a kitchen and lodging for enslaved workers. A building originally built near the campus around 1842 as a stopover office for stage and postal coaches was later used as a classroom annex by the Union Female College. Still later, this building was converted to use as a private residence and it is the only building associated with the college that is still standing.

An 1850 advertisement for the Oxford Female Institute noted that its buildings were "large and commodious," and an 1854 ad for the school described its buildings as "commodious and well-ventilated." In 1856, the Union Female College constructed a new three-story main building for $25,000.00. The 50 x 100 foot brick building was Greek revival in style with nine bays. Its east-facing entrance included a portico resting on four large Tuscan columns and a plaster veneer carved to resemble stone blocks. It was built about one hundred feet east of the original building, and a plank walkway connected the two buildings.

During an extensive 1897 renovation of the campus, the older two-story building was razed and a three-story ell was added to the rear of the main structure. After the 1897 renovation, it included numerous classrooms, seven music rooms, a studio, a chapel, parlors, dining halls, and seventeen bedrooms for boarding students. The college had extensive grounds.

== Academics ==
Oxford Female Institute had two divisions: primary and academical. It was primarily a finishing school. The primary school taught geography, basic mathematics, reading, spelling, and writing. The three grades of the academical track included English grammar, writing, poetry, geography, U.S. history, rhetoric, botany, physiology, astronomy, moral and mental philosophy, Greek, Latin, French, and Spanish, higher mathematics, chemistry, natural philosophy, Extra class included drawing, painting, vocal and instrumental music (piano, harp, and guitar), and ornamental needlework.

Union Female College advertised that it "molded cultured women and Christian ladies". It taught elocution, gymnastics, and music. Additionally, it had a normal school department for teacher training.

== Notable alumnae ==
- Effiegene Wingo – member of the United States House of Representatives

== See also ==
- List of women's universities and colleges in the United States
- Women's colleges in the Southern United States
