= Emma Augusta Lehman =

American teacher, poet, naturalist and botanical collector (1841–1922)

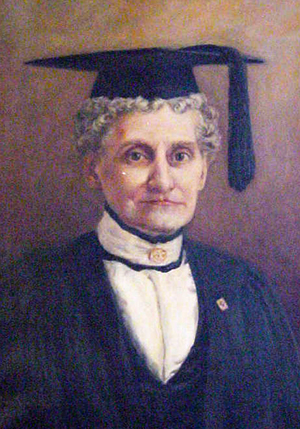
- Born: August 28, 1841; Bethania, North Carolina
- Died: November 6, 1922 (aged 81); Bethania, North Carolina
- Education: Salem Female Academy
- Occupations: Teacher, poet, naturalist, botanical collector

Emma Augusta Lehman (August 28, 1841 – November 6, 1922) was an American teacher, poet, naturalist and botanical collector.

== Biography ==
Born on August 28, 1841, in Bethania, North Carolina, Emma Augusta Lehman was the daughter of Christian Eugene Lehman (1809 – 1857) and Amanda Sophia Butner (1817 – 1868).

She graduated from the Salem Female Academy, Winston-Salem, where, in 1864, she became a member of the faculty, and served for fifty-two years. Though she was specialized in English literature, she taught wide range of courses including “piano, art, astronomy, and botany”.

In 1914 the Salem College awarded her an honorary M.S. degree to mark her fiftieth year of service in teaching. To recognize her contributions, a Chair of Literature was also named after her at the Salem College.

Her important publications include Sketches of European Travels (1890) and Poems (1904).

She was 81 years old when she died on November 6, 1922, in Bethania.
