= Bertha V. Fontaine =

American home economist (1929–1986)

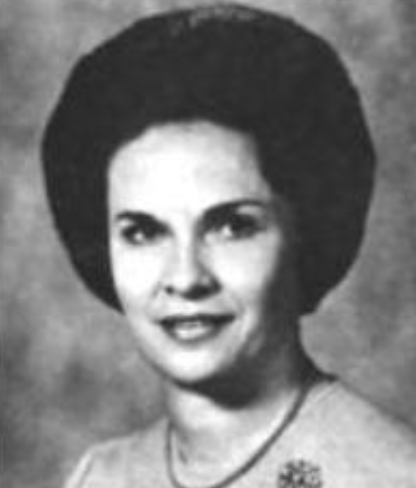
- Bertha V. Fontaine, from a 1972 publication of the US Department of Commerce
- Born: Bertha Mae Van Landingham; 3 September 1929
- Died: 2 November 1986 (aged 57); Pascagoula, Mississippi, U.S.
- Occupation: Home economist

Bertha Mae Van Landingham Fontaine (September 3, 1929 – November 2, 1986) was an American home economist with the National Marine Fisheries Service. She was tasked with promoting the home use of seafood, through demonstrations, recipes, and media appearances, to support the fishing and canning industries in the Gulf Coast.

== Early life ==
Bertha Mae Van Landingham was born in Mississippi or Memphis, Tennessee (sources vary on the location), and raised in Mississippi, the daughter of Leander Shelton Van Landingham, and Bertha Shumaker Van Landingham. She graduated from Mississippi University for Women, with further studies at the University of Alabama.

== Career ==
Fontaine taught high school home economics in Pascagoula. She joined the National Marine Fisheries Service as a home economist. She worked in the service's test kitchen in Pascagoula, developing recipes to promote the home use of Gulf-caught fish and seafood, including canned products. She also traveled to give demonstrations, trained home economists, organized contests, and appeared on television programs talking about seafood. She was a consultant to Alcorn A&M University.

Fontaine received the national NOAA Award for Public Service in 1971. Her contributions were also recognized by the governor of Florida and by the Southeastern Fisheries Association and the Alabama Fisheries Association.

Fontaine co-edited and contributed shrimp recipes to a cookbook, Seafood Adventures from the Gulf and South Atlantic (1980).

== Personal life ==
Vanlandingham married businessman Douglass Latimer Fontaine in 1960. They had three children. She died in Pascagoula in 1986, aged 57 years.
