= Women's colleges in the United States =

Single-sex institutions of higher education

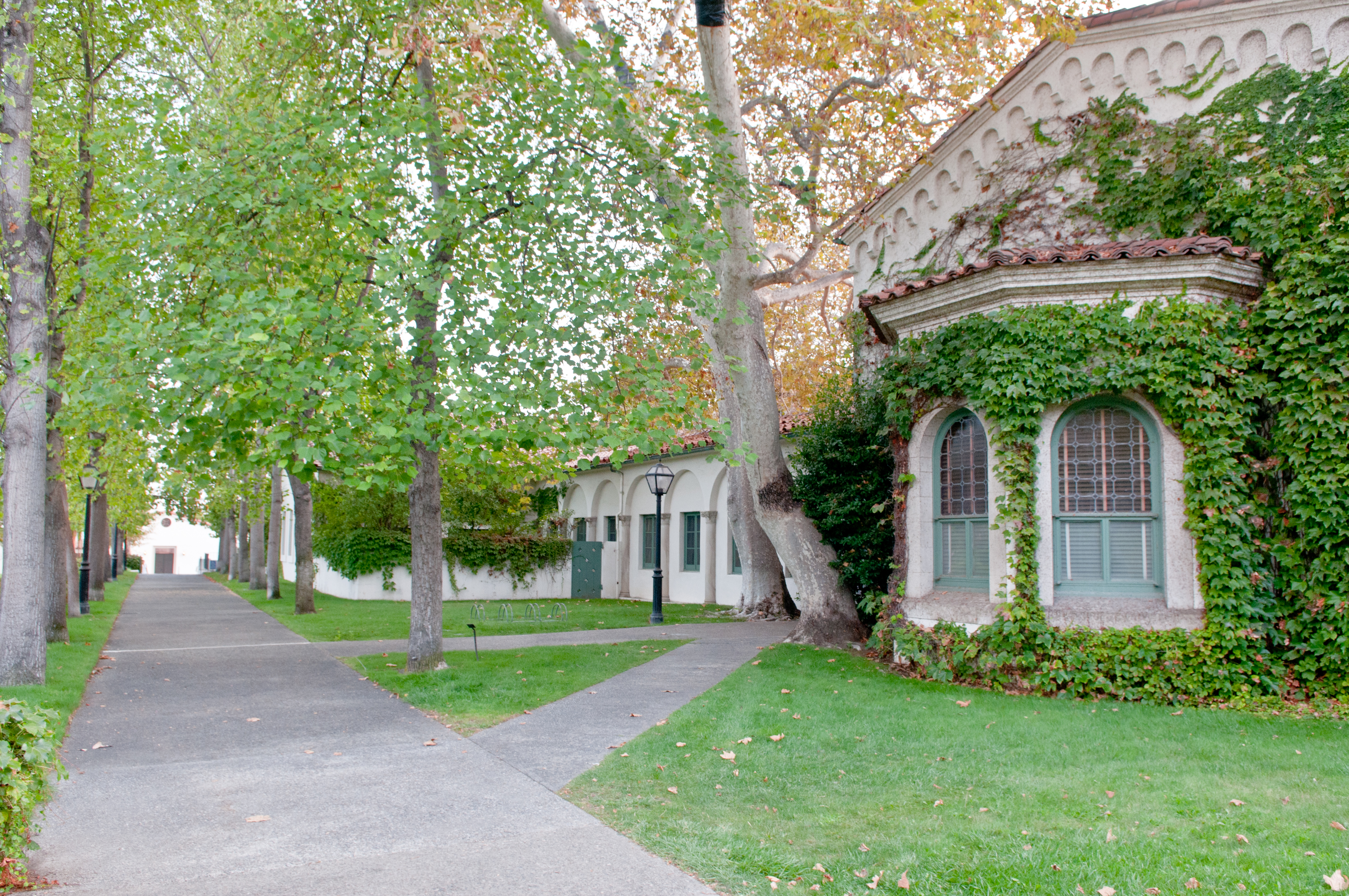
Scripps College in Claremont, California

Women's colleges in the United States are private single-sex U.S. institutions of higher education that only admit female students. They are often liberal arts colleges. There are approximately 29 active women's colleges in the United States in 2024, down from a peak of 281 such colleges in the 1960s.

== History ==
=== Origins and types ===
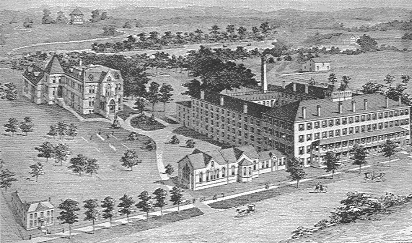
Mount Holyoke College (Mount Holyoke Female Seminary) in 1837

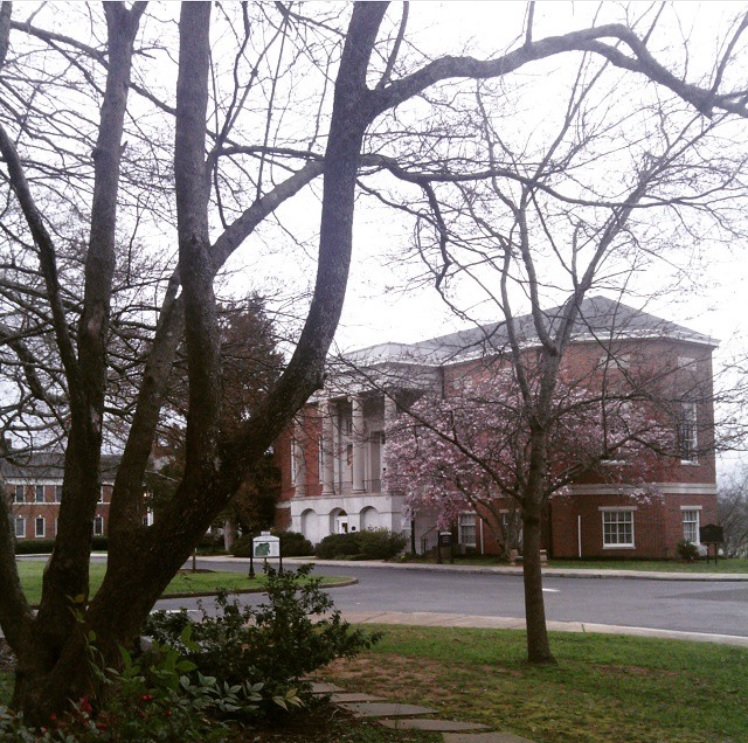
Wesleyan College

Education for girls and women was originally provided within the family, by local dame schools and public elementary schools, and at female seminaries found in every colony. Access to this education was however limited to women from families with the means to pay tuition and placed its focus on "ladylike" accomplishments rather than academic training. These seminaries or academies were usually small and often ephemeral. Founded by a single woman or small group of women, they often failed to outlive their founders.

The different trajectories of early women's schools complicate the claims of various colleges to have been the "first" women's college. A number of 18th or early 19th-century female seminaries later grew into academic, degree-granting colleges, while others became notable private high schools. Being a female seminary at an early date is therefore not necessarily equivalent to having been a women's college at that date.

Mary Lyon developed her ideas on how to educate women when she was assistant principal at Ipswich Female Seminary in Massachusetts. By 1837 she had convinced sponsors to support a new school—the first real college for women. Mount Holyoke Female Seminary opened on November 8, 1837, in South Hadley, Massachusetts. The town had donated the land and main building. Lyon's layout of the campus provided a widely imitated model for the higher education of women by providing a physical environment that supported a rigorous and comprehensive curriculum equivalent to that of men's colleges. Lyon's innovative goals set her Seminary apart from other female seminaries of the period, offering a curriculum equivalent to those at men's colleges. All the students worked in one building with little privacy. There was close contact with the all-female faculty, and daily self reports on their personal strengths and weaknesses. The college cut staff to the minimum as the 100 or so students each performed one hour of work a day, handling most of the routine chores like cooking and cleaning and maintaining the grounds. Lyon rejected the goal of the men's colleges to promote individualism and independence and instead fostered the collective ideal of a united team of women could match the success of nearby men's colleges like Amherst and Williams. The curriculum allowed women to study subjects like geometry, calculus, Latin, Greek, science, philosophy, and history, which were not typically taught at female seminaries.

Institutions of higher education for women were primarily founded during the early 19th century, many as teaching seminaries. As noted by the Women's College Coalition:

The formal education of girls and women began in the middle of the 19th century and was intimately tied to the conception that society had of the appropriate role for women to assume in life. [This education]... was intimately tied to the conception that society had of the appropriate role for women to assume in life [preparing] girls for their future role as wives and mothers... [...] Academic education prepared girls for their role as community leaders and social benefactors and had some elements of the education offered boys. [...] Many early women's colleges began as female seminaries and were responsible for producing an important corps of educators.

Authors Irene Harwarth, Mindi Maline, and Elizabeth DeBra further note that the founding of women's colleges responded to a need for advanced education at a time when most institutions did not admit women.

Early proponents of education for women included Sarah Pierce (Litchfield Female Academy, 1792); Catharine Beecher (Hartford Female Seminary, 1823); Zilpah P. Grant Banister (Ipswich Female Seminary, 1828); Elias Marks (South Carolina Female Collegiate Institute, 1828); and Mary Lyon. Lyon was involved in the development of both Hartford Female Seminary and Ipswich Female Seminary. She was also involved in the creation of Wheaton Female Seminary (now Wheaton College, Massachusetts) in 1834, which was re-chartered as a college in 1912. In 1837, Lyon founded Mount Holyoke Female Seminary (now Mount Holyoke College), which was chartered as a college in 1888. Harwarth, Maline, and DeBra note Mount Holyoke's significance as a model for other women's colleges in the U.S., and both Vassar College and Wellesley College were patterned after Mount Holyoke.

Vassar College was the first of the Seven Sisters to be chartered as a college in 1861. In 1840, the first Catholic women's college Saint Mary-of-the-Woods College was founded by Saint Mother Theodore Guerin of the Sisters of Providence in Indiana as an academy, later becoming the college. The college became co-educational in 2015.

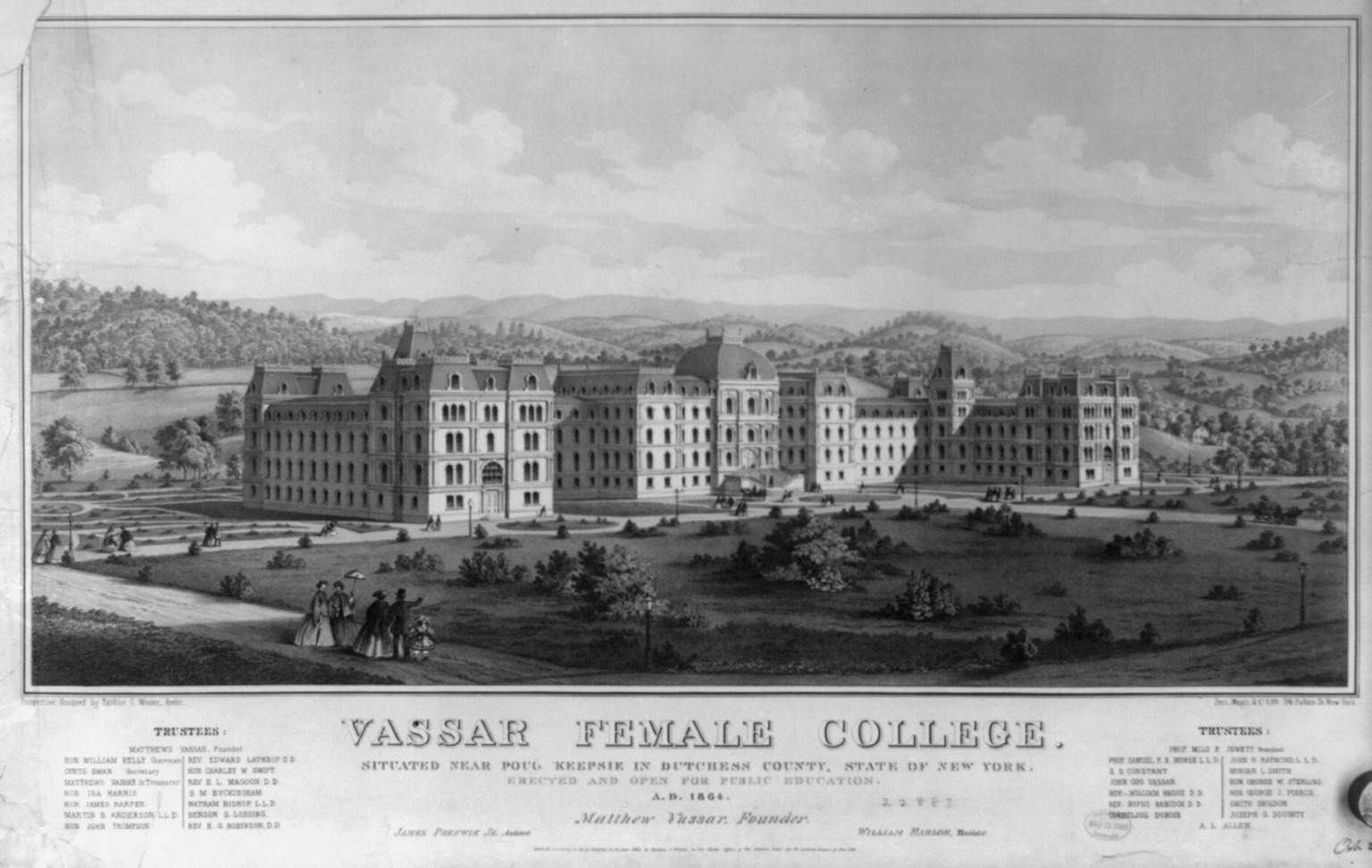
Vassar College in 1862

Some early women's colleges failed to survive. These included Oread Institute, chartered as a college for women in Worcester, Massachusetts in 1849, and the Baltimore Female College, also founded in 1849 at St. Paul Street and East Saratoga Street in downtown Baltimore. The latter later relocated to Park Avenue/Park Place and Wilson Street in the Bolton Hill neighborhood under its longtime president Nathan C. Brooks, until closing in the late 1880s.

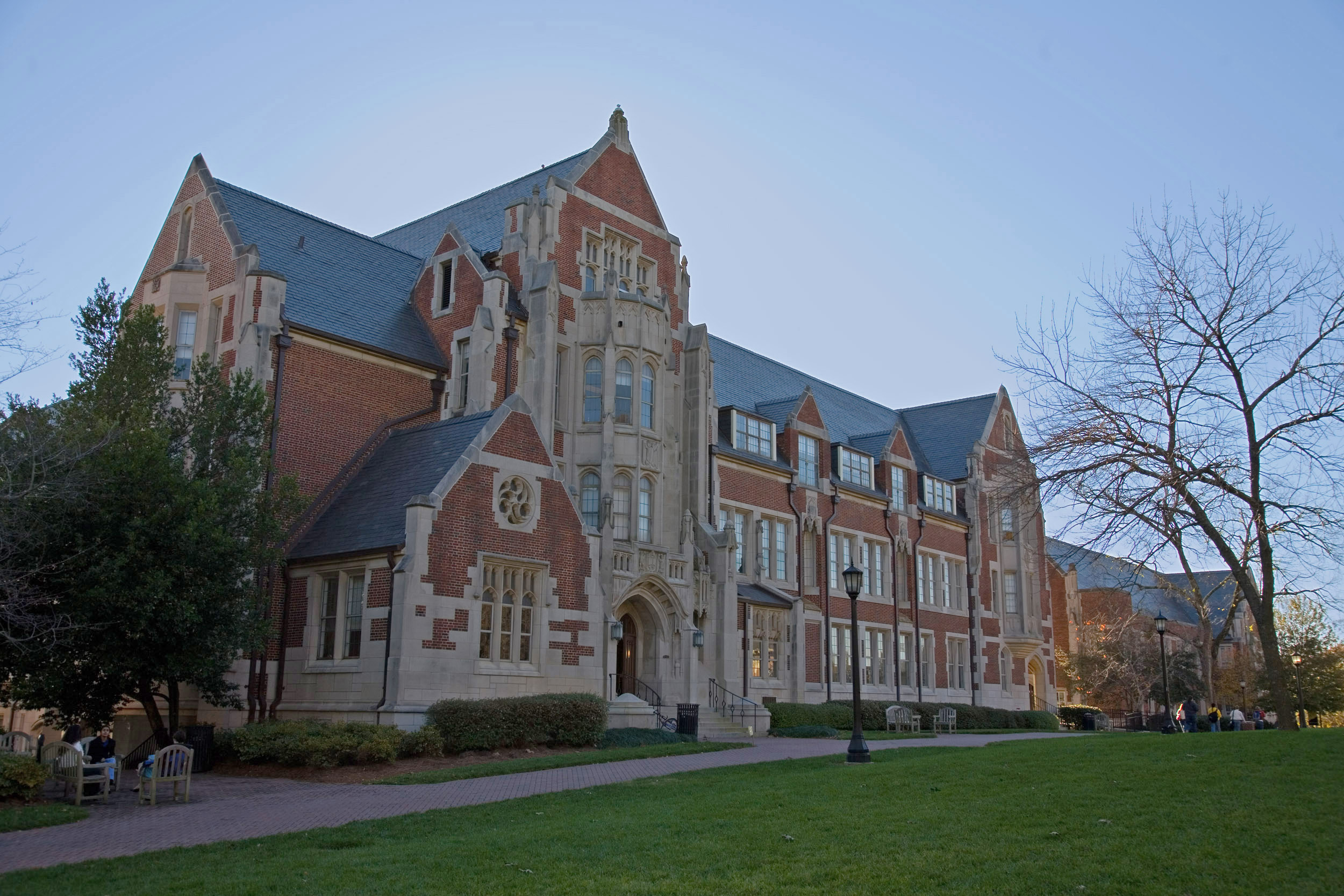
Agnes Scott College

Another early women's school was the Moravian College, originally Bethlehem Female Seminary, founded as a female seminary in 1742 in Germantown and later moved to Bethlehem, Pennsylvania. It began to grant undergraduate degrees in 1863 and became the Moravian Seminary and College for Women in 1913. In 1954, it merged with the boys school, Moravian College and Theological Seminary, and became coeducational. The Moravians of Salem, North Carolina began what is now Salem College in 1772 in Winston-Salem.

Georgia Female College, now Wesleyan College opened in 1839 as the first Southern college for women.

While there were a few coeducational colleges (such as Oberlin College founded in 1833, Guilford College, in 1837, Lawrence University in 1847, Antioch College in 1853, Bates College in 1855), and Cornell University in 1865, almost all colleges and universities at that time were exclusively for men. The first generally accepted coordinate college, H. Sophie Newcomb Memorial College (Tulane University), was founded in 1886, and followed a year later by Evelyn College for Women, the coordinate college for Princeton University. The model was quickly duplicated at other prestigious universities. Notable 19th-century coordinate colleges included Barnard (Columbia University), Pembroke (Brown University), and Radcliffe College (Harvard University). Twentieth-century examples include William Smith College (Hobart College) and Kirkland College, which was associated with Hamilton College.

While the majority of women's colleges are private institutions, there were a few public colleges. In 1884, the legislature of the state of Mississippi established Industrial Institute & College, (later Mississippi University for Women), the first public college for women in the United States. Other states soon followed. Georgia created Georgia State College for Women in 1889, North Carolina created North Carolina Women's College in 1891, and Florida converted its coeducational Florida State College to a women-only school in 1905. This is similar to the establishment of Douglass Residential College (Rutgers University), which was founded as the New Jersey College for Women in 1918 by Mabel Smith Douglass.

Other notable women's colleges include the Seven Sister colleges in the Northeast of the U.S., historically black female educational institutions, small Catholic women's colleges in the United States (SCWCs), and women's colleges in the Southern United States.

=== 20th-century ===
==== World War II ====
Early in 1942, during World War II, debate arose concerning the role of colleges and students during the War. The Selective Service age had been lowered to 18 and a few questions arose: which men would go to college, which ones into the U.S. Army, U.S. Navy, or the U.S. Coast Guard, how the college students would be trained, and whether the colleges would be run by the military organizations or by educators?

The status of women and women's colleges also entered into the debate: "Urging a National Service Act for women, the American Council on Education's President George Zook said: 'It is clear that women students cannot expect to pursue college as usual while their brothers and male friends are rushed off ... Courses for women are going to be shortened and they are going to be directed toward preparation for specific types of war service. ... These War jobs are going to appear to college women to be hard and distasteful. Stronger words could be used for what many of the men are going through'."

==== Women's College Coalition ====
The Women's College Coalition (WCC) was founded in 1979 and describes itself as an "association of women's colleges and universities – public and private, independent and church-related, two- and four-year – in the United States and Canada whose primary mission is the education and advancement of women."

==== Coeducation ====
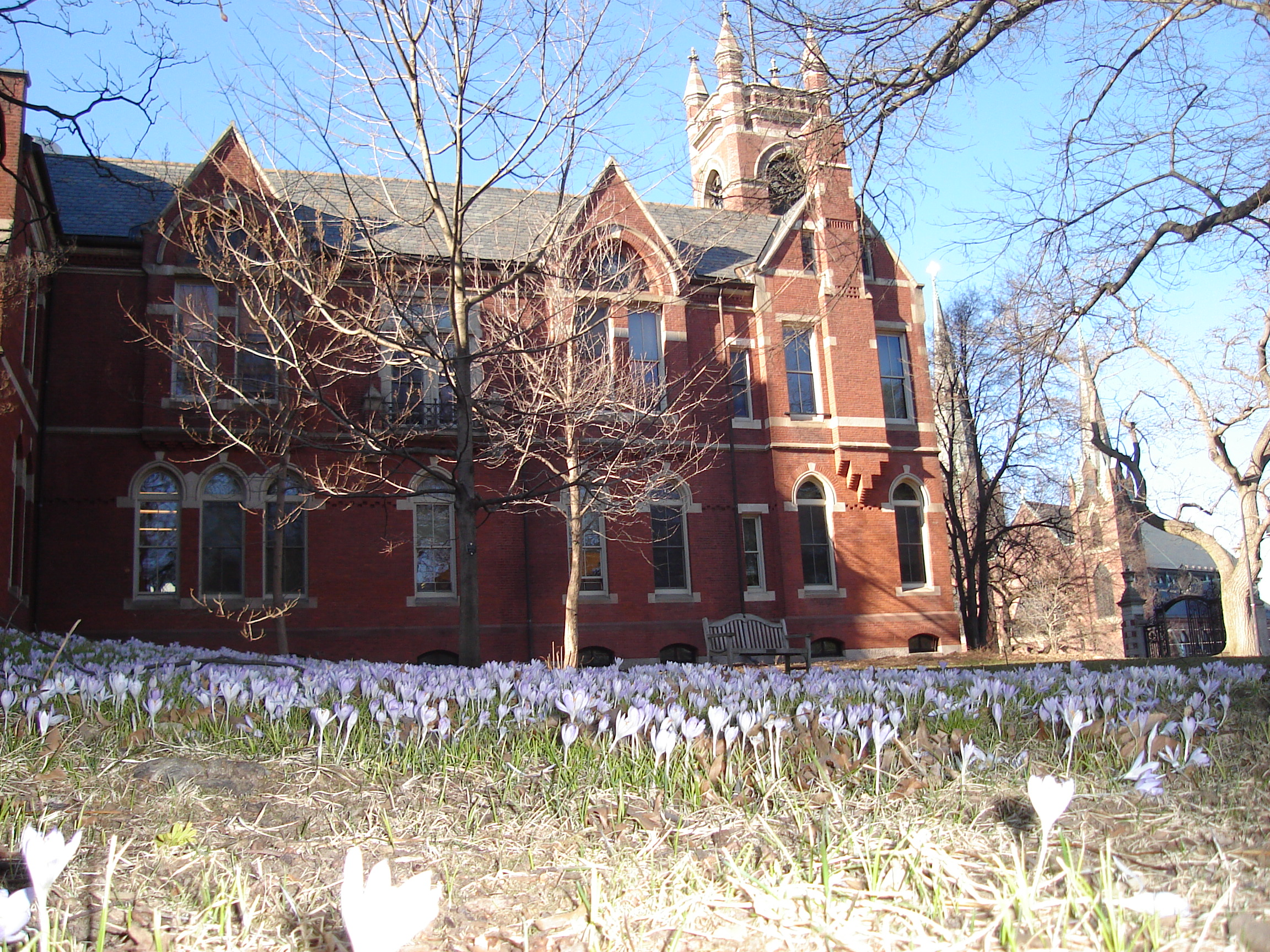
Smith College

With several Supreme Court cases in the 1950s on the appellate court level determining that public single-sex universities violated the Equal Protection Clause of the U.S. Constitution, many women's colleges have decided to accept men. Following a peak of 281 women's colleges in the 1960s, the number of such schools has decreased dramatically. Two of the Seven Sister colleges made transitions during and after the 1960s. The first, Radcliffe College, merged with Harvard University. Beginning in 1963, students at Radcliffe received Harvard diplomas signed by the presidents of Radcliffe and Harvard and joint commencement exercises began in 1970. The same year, several Harvard and Radcliffe dormitories began swapping students experimentally and in 1972 full co-residence was instituted. The departments of athletics of both schools merged shortly thereafter. In 1977, Harvard and Radcliffe signed an agreement that put undergraduate women entirely in Harvard College. In 1999 Radcliffe College was dissolved and Harvard University assumed full responsibility over the affairs of female undergraduates. Radcliffe is now the Radcliffe Institute for Advanced Study at Harvard University. The second, Vassar College, declined an offer to merge with Yale University and instead became coeducational in 1969. The remaining Seven Sisters decided against coeducation. Mount Holyoke College engaged in a lengthy debate under the presidency of David Truman over the issue of coeducation. On November 6, 1971, "after reviewing an exhaustive study on coeducation, the board of trustees decided unanimously that Mount Holyoke should remain a women's college, and a group of faculty was charged with recommending curricular changes that would support the decision." Smith College also made a similar decision in 1971. In 1969, Bryn Mawr College and Haverford College (then all-male) developed a system of sharing residential colleges. When Haverford became coeducational in 1980, Bryn Mawr discussed the possibly of coeducation as well, but decided against it. In 1983, Columbia University began admitting women after a decade of failed negotiations with Barnard College for a merger along the lines of Harvard and Radcliffe (Barnard has been affiliated with Columbia since 1900, but it continues to be independently governed). Wellesley College also decided against coeducation during this time.

A few historically black women's colleges became coeducational: Barber-Scotia College adopted coeducation in 1954; Tillotson College (a women's college from 1926 to 1935) is now coeducational Huston–Tillotson University; Hartshorn Memorial College merged with Virginia Union University in 1932; and Mary Allen Seminary became coeducational in 1933. Bennett College, founded as a coeducational school, became a women's college in 1926.

Many public women's schools also went coeducational in the postwar era. One of the first schools to make the transition in this era was Madison College in Virginia, known since 1976 as James Madison University. The school, founded as a women's college in 1908, admitted its first male day students in 1946, although it was not officially recognized as a coeducational institution until 1966. In 1947, Florida State College for Women returned to its original status as a coeducational institution and adopted its current name of Florida State University. Three other public women's schools in Virginia later followed Madison College in adopting coeducation—Mary Washington College, now the University of Mary Washington, in 1970; Radford College, now Radford University, in 1972; and Longwood College, now Longwood University, in 1976. In North Carolina, the Women's College of the University of North Carolina was converted to the coeducational University of North Carolina at Greensboro in 1963, at the same time as women were finally admitted to all programs of its rival school, the University of North Carolina at Chapel Hill. In 1967, the school then known as the Women's College of Georgia became coeducational; it is now Georgia College & State University.

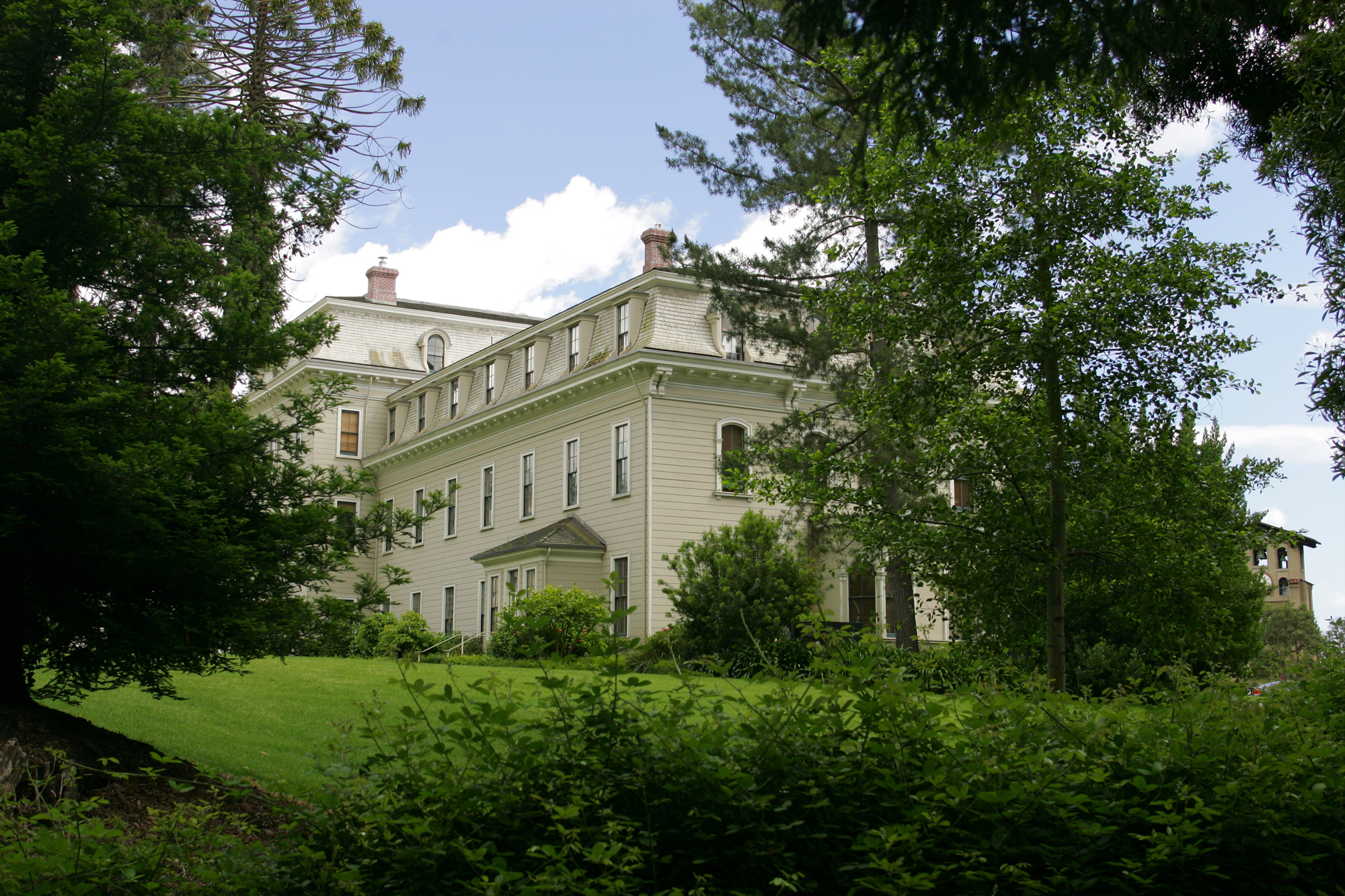
Mills College

Mississippi University for Women changed its single-sex admissions policy to include men in 1982 following the U.S. Supreme Court ruling in Mississippi University for Women v. Hogan. The court found that the university would violate the Fourteenth Amendment's Equal Protection Clause if it denied admission to its nursing program on the basis of gender. The 5-4 opinion was written by Justice O'Connor, who stated that "In limited circumstances, a gender-based classification favoring one sex can be justified if it intentionally and directly assists members of the sex that is disproportionately burdened." She argued that there are a disproportionate number of women who are nurses, and that denying admission to men "lends credibility to the old view that women, not men, should become nurses, and makes the assumption that nursing is a field for women a self-fulfilling prophecy." The ruling did not require the university to change its name to reflect its coeducational status.

In 1972, Texas Woman's University allowed men to its health science graduate school. In 1994, the university opened all programs to male students. Despite the university accepting male students, the university's mission is still to serve primarily women. Today, the student body is approximately 90% female and is led by a woman chancellor.

On May 3, 1990, the Trustees of Mills College announced that they had voted to admit male students. This decision led to a two-week student and staff strike, accompanied by numerous displays of non-violent protests by the students. At one point, nearly 300 students blockaded the administrative offices and boycotted classes. On May 18, the Trustees met again to reconsider the decision, leading finally to a reversal of the vote.

=== 21st-century ===
The trend toward coeducation continued in the 21st century. Notre Dame College in Ohio admitted its first men in 2001. In Pennsylvania, Seton Hill University went coeducational in 2002, and Chestnut Hill College, which had established a coeducational graduate program in 1980, admitted its first male undergraduates in 2003.

Beginning in late 2004 the debate concerning coeducation resurfaced when, citing decreased enrollment, Wells College announced that it would adopt coeducation. In response, there were student protests on campus. Parents of students also became involved in the protests, as did many alumnae. Some of the students stated that their protests were patterned after those at Mills College in the early 1990s. A website called Wells for Women was also established. When the decision to adopt coeducation was approved, students filed a lawsuit that was eventually rejected. Wells became coeducational in 2005.

A few other colleges became coeducational in this period. Immaculata University and Lesley College also announced that they would adopt coeducation around this time and became coeducational in 2005. In 2006, H. Sophie Newcomb Memorial College was dissolved as part of the aftermath of Hurricane Katrina. In 2007, Douglass College of Rutgers University merged with the coed Rutgers College, changing its name to the Douglass Residential College. While a part of Rutgers, it will offer dormitories and classes exclusively for women. Regis College became coeducational in 2007.

Debate increased when Randolph-Macon Woman's College announced that it would adopt coeducation and change its name. Former Interim president Ginger H. Worden argued (in a September 17, 2006 editorial for the Washington Post) that it was not economically feasible for the college to remain single-sex as young women are no longer interested in attending women's colleges. In response, a number of presidents of women's colleges challenged Worden's article, arguing that other women's colleges are still doing well and attracting students. Randolph-Macon Woman's College students protested the decision and two lawsuits were filed by Preserve Education Choice (PEC), a non-profit organization composed of students, faculty, and alumnae. The Lynchburg Circuit Court dismissed both lawsuits on January 23, 2007. The Virginia Supreme Court agreed to hear appeals in both the student contract and charitable trust cases. The Court affirmed the trial court's decision in both cases in opinions issued June 6, 2008. The school was renamed Randolph College on July 1, 2007, when it became coeducational.

A similar controversy erupted in 2011 when Peace College, in Raleigh, North Carolina, announced its plans to become coeducational beginning the following year. Despite protests from alumnae, William Peace University began admitting men in the fall of 2012. Also in fall 2012, Georgian Court University in New Jersey admitted its first male day students; in 2013–14, that school became fully coeducational, with men being allowed to live on campus and participate in all campus activities.

Sweet Briar College announced March 3, 2015, that it was closing Aug. 25 due to "insurmountable financial challenges." Almost immediately, a legal challenge was mounted by students, faculty, and alumnae to keep the school open. On June 22, 2015, a settlement brokered by the attorney general of Virginia was accepted by the county circuit court that resulted in Sweet Briar College remaining open.

The trend of former women's colleges becoming coed continued in the last half of the 2010s. Midway University in Kentucky announced in May 2016 that it would admit men into its daytime undergraduate program, the last component of the institution that remained women-only, effective that August. In announcing the move, the school's president noted that many surveys indicated that only 2% of high school girls wanted to attend a women-only school, and added, "We see this change as strengthening our historic mission to educate women by broadening our reach to that 98 percent of young women who would never consider a women's college." The following year, the University of Saint Joseph in Connecticut, the last women-only school in the state and last Catholic women's college in New England, voted to become fully coeducational, with the first men admitted to the daytime undergraduate program in August 2018. Much like Midway, the daytime undergraduate program had been the last Saint Joseph component to be women-only; the institution already had male graduate students, plus male undergraduates in a special evening program for adult students. When this transition was announced, Saint Joseph's president cited the same surveys as Midway's president had in 2016.

A number of women's colleges have taken steps to adopt policies inclusive of transgender students. As of June 2015, seven women's colleges (Barnard College, Bryn Mawr College, Mills College, Mount Holyoke College, Simmons University, Scripps College, and Smith College) have articulated admissions policies regarding transgender applicants.

== Notable alumnae of women's colleges ==
Women's colleges in the United States have produced a number of important alumnae in the arts, business, politics, and in the sciences.

== List of current women's colleges and universities in the United States ==
- Agnes Scott College
- Alverno College
- Assumption College for Sisters
- Barnard College
- Bay Path University
- Bennett College
- Bryn Mawr College
- Cedar Crest College
- College of St. Benedict
- College of Saint Mary
- Cottey College
- Hollins University
- Meredith College
- Moore College of Art and Design
- Mount Holyoke College
- Mount Mary University
- St. Catherine University
- Saint Mary's College
- Salem College
- Scripps College
- Simmons University
- Smith College
- Spelman College
- Stephens College
- Stern College for Women
- Sweet Briar College
- Trinity Washington University
- Wellesley College
- Wesleyan College

== See also ==
- List of coordinate colleges
- List of women's universities and colleges in the United States
- Women Presidents or Chancellors of Co-ed Colleges and Universities
- Timeline of women's colleges in the United States
- Seven Sisters (colleges)
- Women's colleges in the Southern United States
- Women's College Coalition
- List of girls' schools in the United States
- Men's colleges in the United States
- Mixed-sex education
