= Adelaide Fries =

American historian (1871–1949)

Dr. Adelaide Lisetta Fries (12 November 1871–29 November 1949) was the foremost scholar of the history and genealogy of the Moravians in the southern United States. She made important contributions to the field as archivist, translator, author and editor.

== Biography ==
Fries was born in Salem (now Winston-Salem), North Carolina, the elder of two daughters of John William Fries (1846–1927) and Agnes Sophia (de Schweinitz) Fries (1849–1915). Her family was prominent in the Moravian Church and community, with a history dating back to Nicolaus Zinzendorf, who has been called the father of the renewed Moravian church. Fries attended Salem Academy and graduated in 1888, later receiving a Bachelor of Arts from Salem College. She never married, and lived with her parents in Winston-Salem until their deaths. Her sister was Mary Elenor Fries Blair (1873-1966).

On September 26, 1911, the Provincial Elders' Conference of the Moravian Church in America, Southern Province, appointed Fries as archivist of the Southern Province, and granted her the use of a warehouse in Salem as repository and offices. The records from North Carolina began in 1752. She immediately began collecting, organizing, translating and publishing records, a work that continued until her death. Fries was never satisfied that the warehouse was a safe repository, and over the years her friends and supporters raised enough money to convert the former office of the Vorsteher (business manager) of the Salem community into a fireproof repository. The archives moved into the new building in 1942.

One of Fries' best-known books is The Road To Salem (1944), an account of the life of Anna Catharina (Antes) Ernst (1726-1816). Written in the first person, the book is based on Ernst's autobiography and on the diaries and records kept by leaders of the Moravian Church in Georgia, Pennsylvania, and North Carolina. Another well-known book, The Moravians in Georgia, has entered the public domain and is available online. Forsyth County was revised and updated in 1949, and a further revision and update was issued in 1976 under the oversight of J. Edwin Hendricks of Wake Forest University.

At the time of her death, Fries had translated, organized, and recorded documents held by families, churches, and libraries into the seven-volume The Records of Moravians in North Carolina. Constantly at work, she continued in her usual activities until a few hours before her death at age 78.

In recognition of her work, Fries was awarded an honorary doctorate from Moravian University, and received similar degrees from Wake Forest College and the University of North Carolina. She was the president for the Salem College Alumnae Association from 1905 to 1934, and she served as president to other associations for women and historical endeavors, including the Historical Society of North Carolina.

== Books ==
- Forsyth County (1898)
- Historical Sketch Of Salem Female Academy (1902)
- The Moravians in Georgia, 1735-1740 (1905)
- The Mecklenburg Declaration Of Independence As Mentioned In the Records of Wachovia (1907)
- Der North Carolina Land Und Colonie Etablissement (1910)
- The Pflegerin (1914)
- The Town Builders (1915)
- An Early Fourth Of July Celebration (1915)
- Records of the Moravians in North Carolina (1922-1954): Volume I (1752-1771), 1922; Volume II (1752-1775), 1925; Volume III (1776-1779), 1926; Volume IV (1780-1783), 1930; Volume V (1784-1792), 1941; Volume VI (1793-1808), 1943; Volume VII (1809-1822), 1947; Volume VIII (1823-1837), 1954 (Volume VIII completed by Douglas LeTell Rights).
- The Moravian Church: Yesterday and Today (1926)
- North Carolina Certificates of the Revolutionary War Period (1932)
- Some Moravian Heroes (1936)
- Moravian Customs: Our Inheritance (1936)
- Index To Memoirs Filed In the Salem Moravian Archives (1938)
- Distinctive Customs and Practices of the Moravian Church (1941)
- Graveyard Registry of Friedland Moravian Church (1941)
- The Road To Salem (1944)
- Parallel Lines In Piedmont North Carolina Quaker and Moravian History (1949)
