= Doris Taylor =

American biologist and scientific researcher

Doris Taylor FACC, FAHA
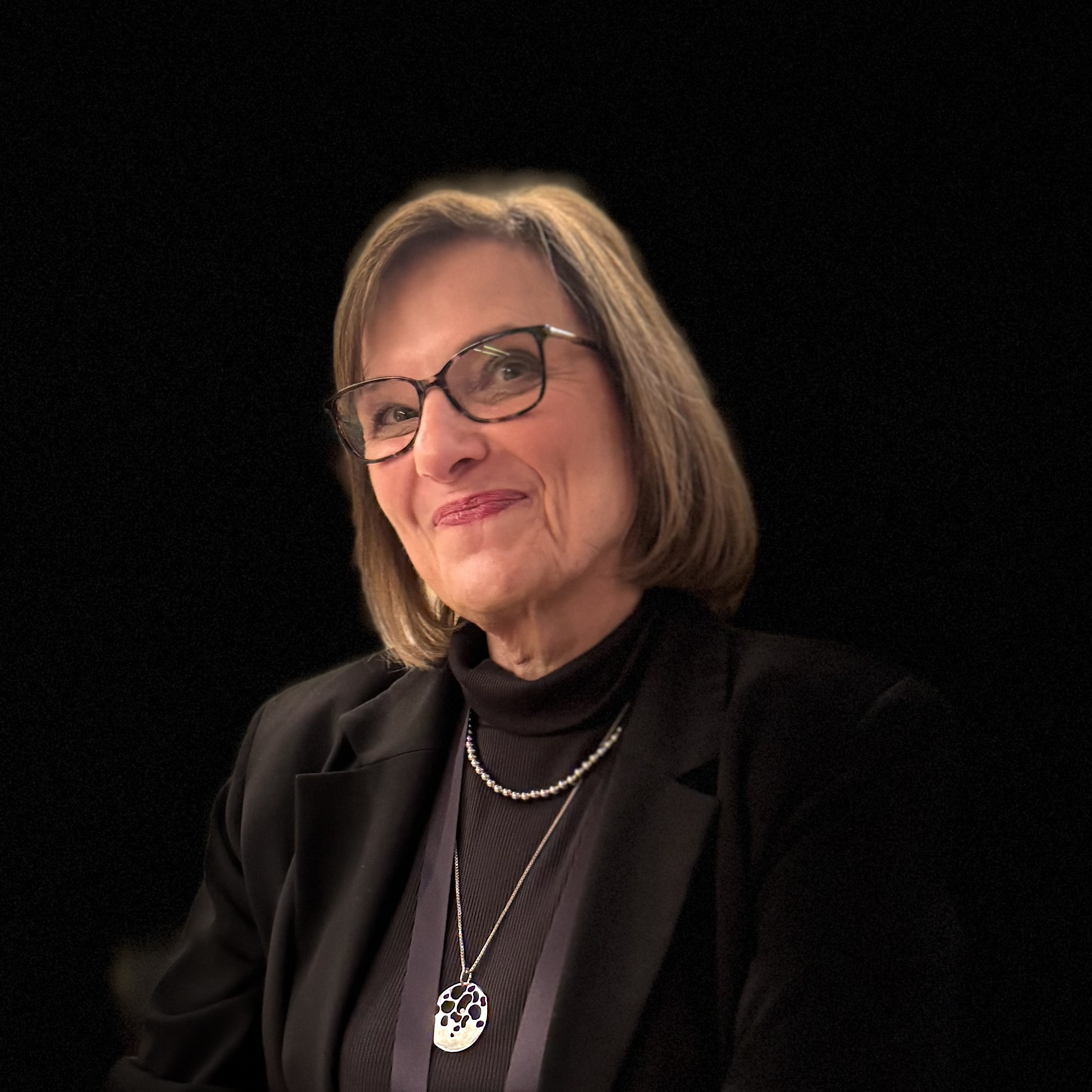
- Taylor in 2025
- Born: San Francisco
- Education: Mississippi University for Women, University of Texas Southwestern Medical Center
- Known for: regenerative medicine
- Scientific career
- Workplaces: Duke University, Texas Heart Institute

Doris Anita Taylor is an American scientist working in regenerative medicine and tissue engineering. She was the Director, Regenerative Medicine Research and Director, Center for Cell and Organ Biotechnology at the Texas Heart Institute in Houston, Texas until March 2020. She is the Co-Founder of Miromatrix Medical, Inc. and Co-Founder of Organamet Bio, Inc.

== Biography ==
Taylor was born in San Francisco and lived in Germany with her parents and two siblings, where her father was in the military. When Taylor was 6 years old, her father was diagnosed with cancer, and the family moved to Texas to seek medical treatment. Experiencing her father's death from cancer, and caring for her brother, who had schizophrenia, led her to a career in medical research.

Taylor earned her B.S. from Mississippi University for Women in Biology and Physical Sciences and earned her PhD in Pharmacology from the University of Texas Southwestern Medical Center, Dallas, Texas. She did her post-doctoral studies at Albert Einstein College of Medicine in the Bronx, New York, where she first worked with tissue engineering, growing heart muscle cells in the laboratory.

She was on the faculty of Duke University from 1991 to 2007, on the faculty of the University of Minnesota from 2003 to 2012, and was with the Texas Heart Institute from 2012 to 2020. As of 2014 she retains an adjunct professor role at University of Minnesota and was an adjunct professor at Texas A&M University until 2020.

== Research ==
In 2008, Taylor's team published a paper in Nature Medicine showing that her team could create beating rat hearts using tissue engineering; the work was called a "landmark". The lab first stripped the cells away from a rat heart (a process called "decellularization") and then injected rat stem cells into the decellularized rat heart.

Taylor also is conducting research which has uncovered differences in the underlying framework of male and female hearts and other vital organs.
