= Cashavelly Morrison =

American singer-songwriter

- Birth name: Melissa Diane Meredith Bickey
- Born: March 26, 1981 (age 43); Beckley, West Virginia, U.S.
- Genres: Americana, folk
- Occupation(s): Singer, songwriter
- Instrument(s): Vocals, guitar, autoharp
- Years active: 2015–present
- Website: cashavellymorrison.com

Melissa MacLeod, known professionally as Cashavelly Morrison, is an American singer and songwriter.

== Biography ==
Cashavelly Morrison was born Melissa Diane Meredith Bickey in the coal mining town of Beckley, West Virginia. She began dancing from the age of 3, leaving home when she turned 15 to study ballet at the UNC School of the Arts. She turned dancing into a professional career, which she had to quit after a severe spinal injury at the age of 20. She went on to get her undergraduate and master's degrees in English and Creative Writing at Salem College and later at Hollins University and turned her creative energy towards writing prose and later her own songs.

While in college, she met and married Ryan Michael White MacLeod, who was completing his degree in classical guitar. They played together guitar and autoharp, perfecting their musical style.

They recorded sparse versions of their songs at Echo Mountain studio in Asheville, NC, moving on to develop the songs with further instrumentation at the suggestion of their sound engineer. Melissa began to perform with Ryan under the stage name chosen by herself, "Cashavelly" being her paternal grandmother's maiden name and "Morrison" her mother's maiden name.

== Musical style ==
Cashavelly Morrison conceived her songs as an exploration of shared grief, to emphasize universal compassion for those who go unheard and unseen. She quoted Jean Ritchie as her most important influence. Her songs blend together the traditions of American roots, the ballads of Appalachia, and represent a confessional gateway into loss and her deeply held values, notably the racial prejudices in the U.S. and the dire need for equal rights and empowerment for women.

== Discography ==
Cashavelly Morrison released Long-Haired Mare EP in mid-2015. Their single and its accompanying video "Pink Dress" premiered in September 2015 and it earned very favorable reviews for its expressive vocals over country instrumentation and also for touching the issue of female empowerment by challenging societal standards amidst a hauntingly surreal feel. The next video, "Made of Sand", followed in October 2015 and also got praised for its artful lyricism and the authentic approach to expressing her truth.

Her debut album, The Kingdom Belongs to a Child, released on October 30, 2015. Inspired by the tradition of Appalachian ballads, mostly steeped in Americana with hints of folk and world music, it earned praise for its raw emotion, the powerful imagery it revealed and evocative melodies, Cashavelly being favorably compared to Harriet Wheeler, Tori Amos and Natalie Merchant.
