= Salem College =

Women's college in Winston-Salem, North Carolina, US

- Former names: Little Girls' School (1772–1866); Salem Female Academy (1866–1907)
- Motto: "Knowledge and Virtue"
- Type: Private women's liberal arts college
- Established: 1772 (254 years ago); Academy; 1907 (119 years ago); College
- Accreditation: SACS
- Religious affiliation: Moravian Church
- Academic affiliations: WCC; CIC; NCICU; NAICU
- President: Jill Fleuriet
- Undergraduates: 585
- Postgraduates: 50
- Location: Winston-Salem, North Carolina, U.S. 36°05′15″N 80°14′24″W
- Campus: Urban, 57 acres
- Colors: Blue & Gold
- Nickname: Spirits
- Sporting affiliations: NCAA Division III – USA South
- Website: salem.edu
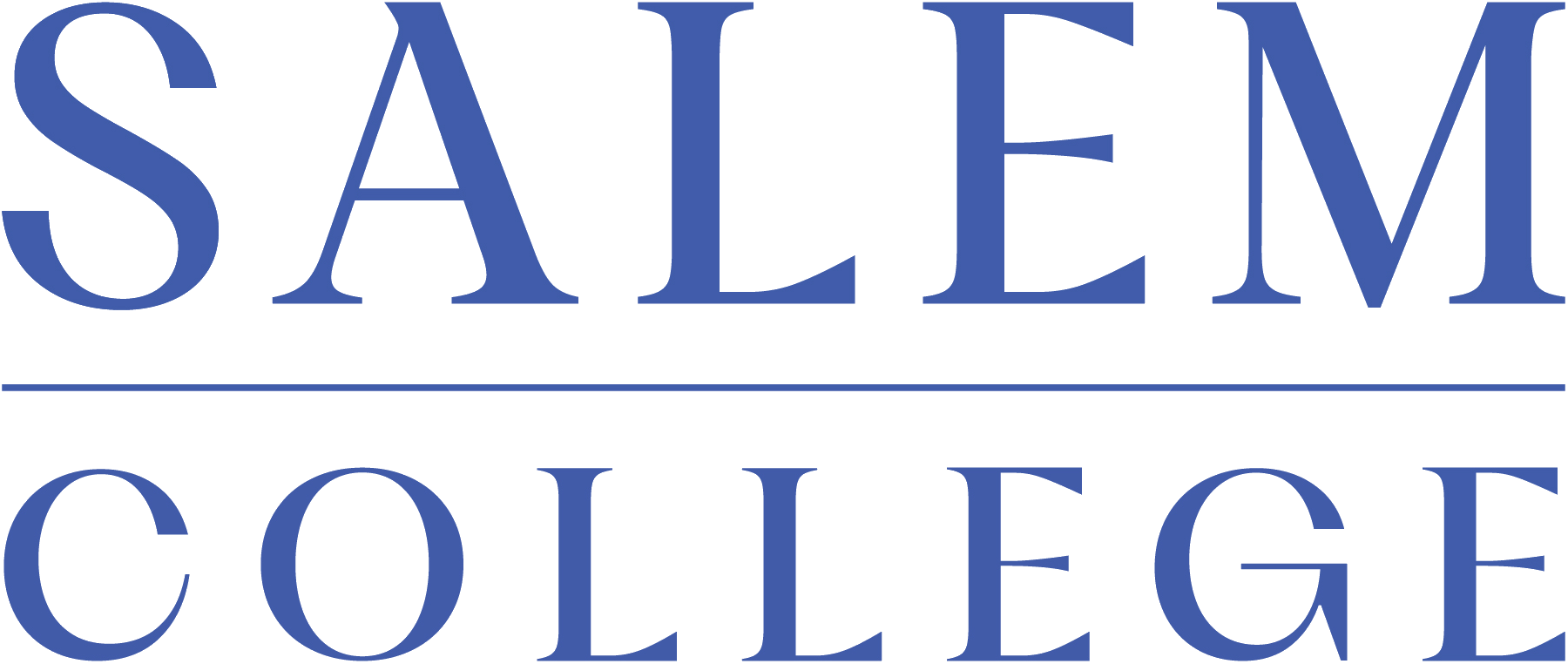

Salem College is a private women's liberal arts college in Winston-Salem, North Carolina, United States. Founded in 1772 as a primary school, it later became an academy (high school) and ultimately added the college. It is the oldest female educational establishment that is still a women's college and the oldest women's college in the United States.

Though Salem is regarded as a women's college, men 23 years of age and over are admitted into graduate-degree programs. Salem College is accredited by the Southern Association of Colleges and Schools Commission on Colleges.

== History ==
Located in the historic Moravian community of Salem, Salem College was originally a girls' school established by the Moravians, who believed strongly in equal education for men and women. On April 22, 1772, the "Little Girls' School" was founded. Elisabeth Oesterlein, who travelled from Bethlehem, Pennsylvania, in 1766, at the age of 17, was hired as the first teacher. In its early years, the girls' school at Salem was led by the Single Sisters, the unmarried women of the Moravian community.

The Single Sisters lived together and were economically self-sufficient, a rarity for women in the eighteenth century. It became a boarding school in 1802 and in 1866 it changed its name to the "Salem Female Academy". The school began giving college diplomas in 1890. In 1907, the name was officially changed to "Salem Academy and College" and to this day both Salem Academy and Salem College share the campus adjacent to Old Salem.

== Campus ==
Salem has an early history of accepting students from diverse backgrounds. Moravian records show that two enslaved African-American girls were accepted at Salem; Hanna, a ten-year-old entered the school in 1785, and Anna Maria Samuel attended the school and lived in the Single Sisters’ House from 1793 until 1795. In 1826, Sally Ridge, the daughter of Cherokee leader Major Ridge, became the first American Indian student at Salem. Jane Ross, the daughter of another Cherokee chief, was also a student, but she left Salem to join her family on the Trail of Tears in 1838.

The oldest building on Salem's campus is the Single Sisters' House. Originally constructed in 1785, an addition was added in 1819. The Single Sisters' House is the oldest building in the United States dedicated to the education of women. Renovation on the Single Sisters' House began in October 2005, and was completed for a re-opening ceremony on April 22, 2007 - marking the 235th anniversary of the founding of Salem. In the fourth-floor attic of the Single Sister's House is its original 1785 datestone. Several interesting features were found in the renovation process including graffiti that was covered by plaster. The building is featured in the children's book "Sister Maus," written and illustrated by Salem College Professor John Hutton. The story portrays a mouse as a stowaway on the trip from Bethlehem, Pennsylvania, to living in the Single Sisters' House. The story was inspired by a mouse hole found in a baseboard of the foyer.

Salem has eight residence halls on campus. Alice Wolle Clewell is designated for first-year students. The additional residence halls are named South, Bahnson House, Hattie Strong, 1772, Mary Reynolds Babcock and Dale H. Gramley. Each hall is named after someone who was important to the community, or a significant date for Salem. In the Spring of 2014 the Student Center was completed to showcase the beautiful campus and be a hub for Salem's student events and gatherings. The student center features a café, career center, theater, student lounge, meeting rooms and a student organizational workroom. Lambert Architecture + Interiors designed the project (built by Frank L. Blum Construction) to be modern and open while reflecting Salem's historic roots. Located adjacent to Corrin Refectory and Bryant Hall, until the completion of a new residence hall in 2018, it was never used by the college though and would be sold to Winston-Salem State University in 2020 during a time of financial instability within the college.

From 1963 to 2018, the Salem campus housed one campus of the Governor's School of North Carolina, a state-run summer program for gifted high school students.

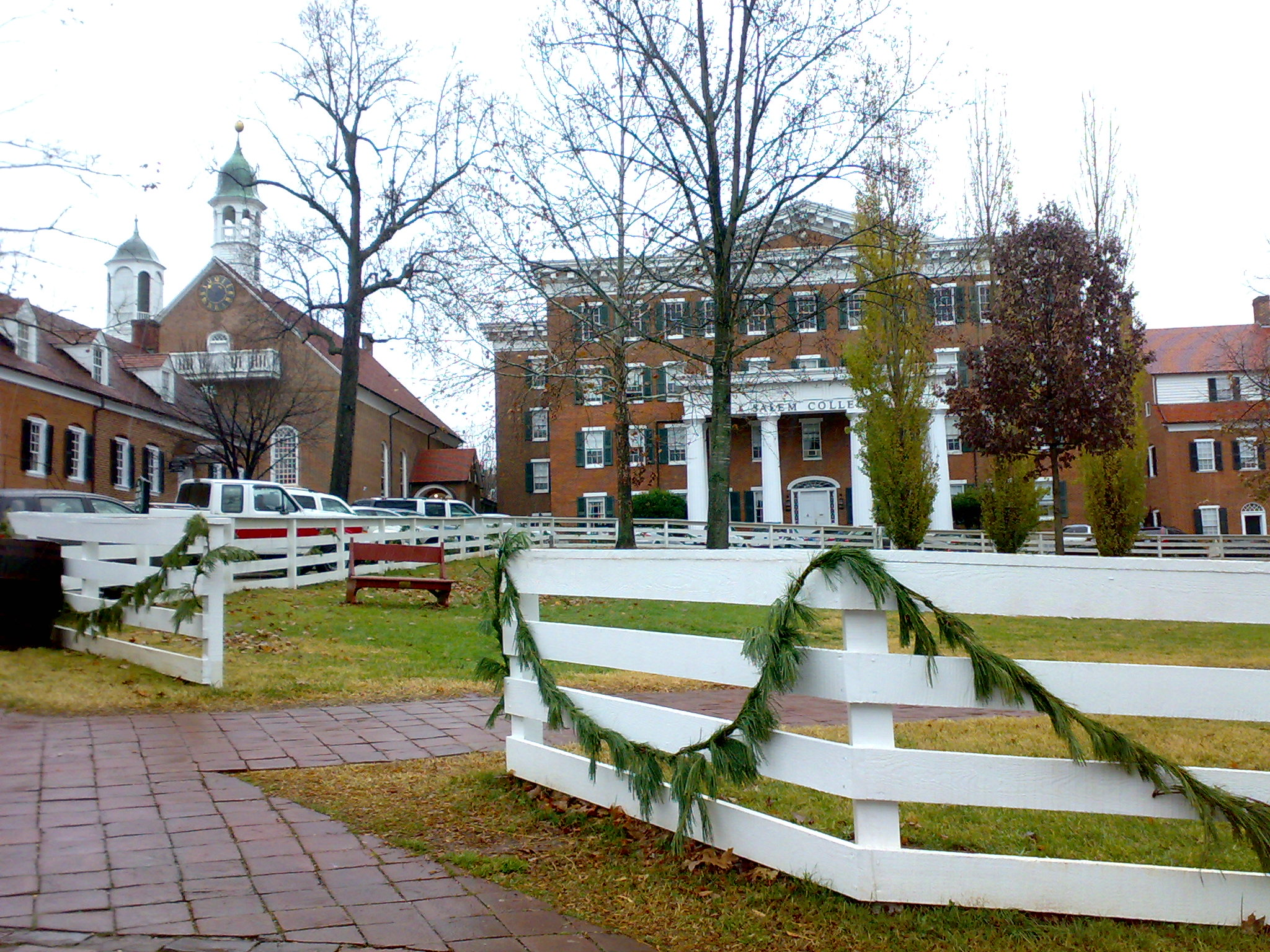
College's campus

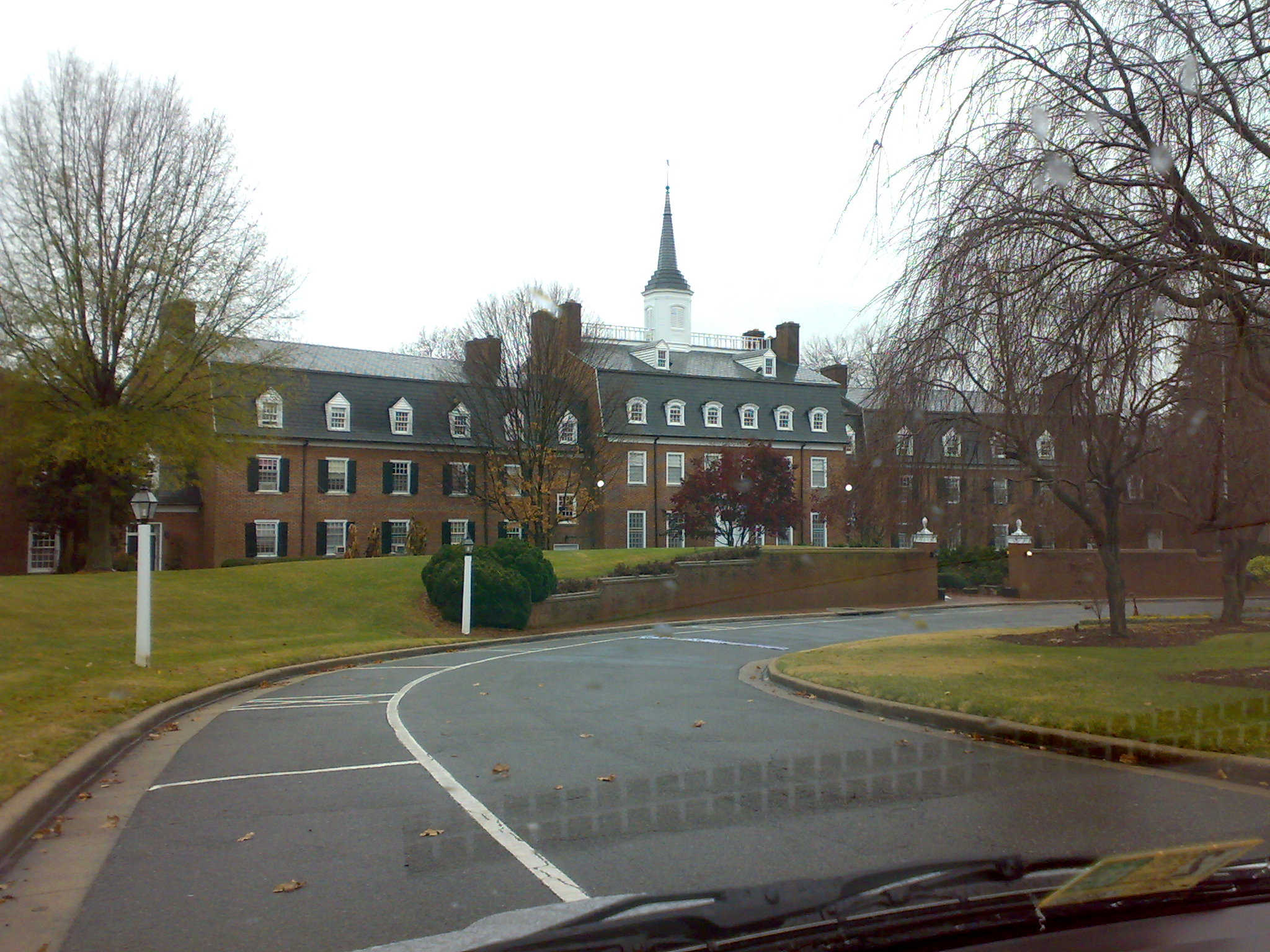
Salem Academy

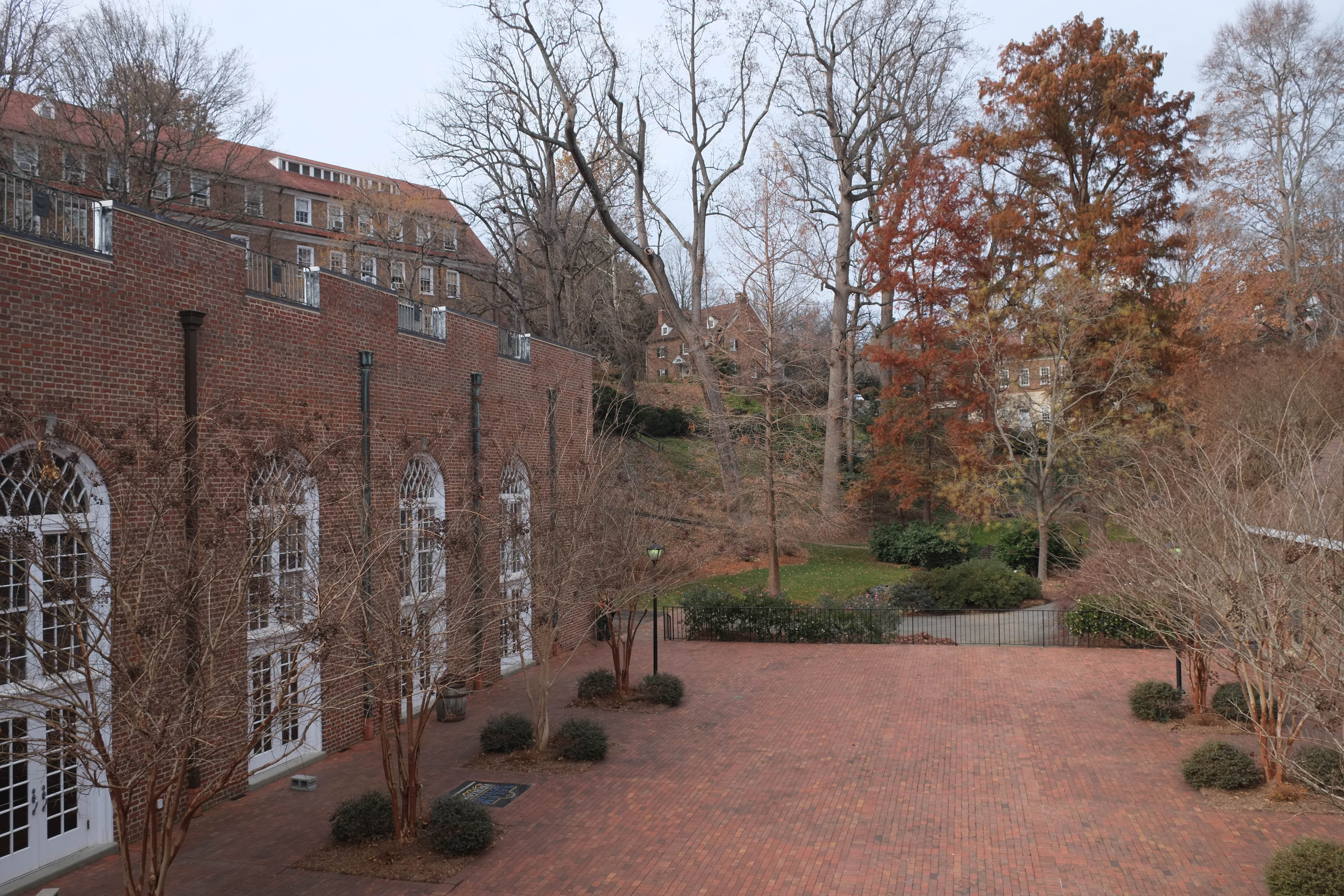
View from Bryant Hall Patio

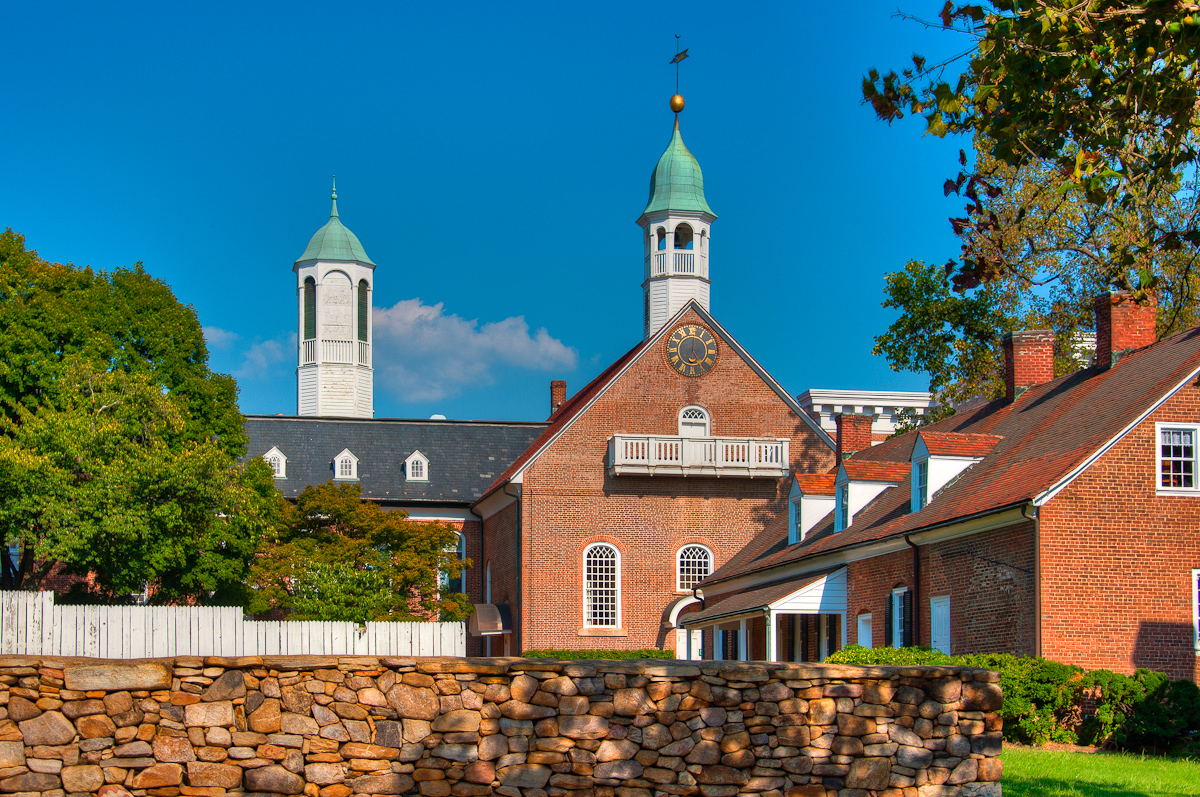
Home Moravian Church

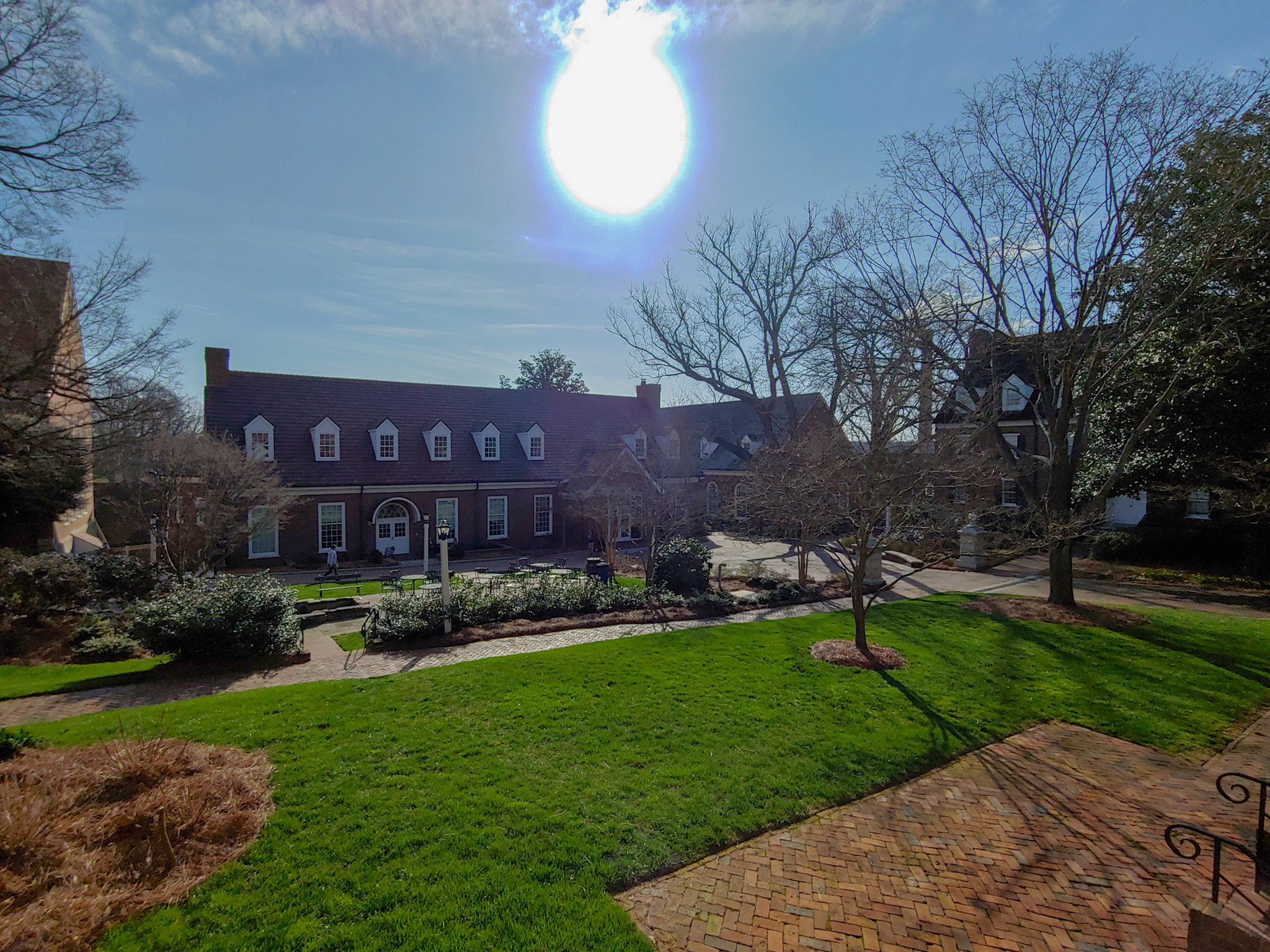
Student Center

== Academics ==
Salem College offers the Bachelor of Arts (B.A.), Bachelor of Science (B.S.), Bachelor of Science in Business Administration (B.S.B.A.), Master of Arts in Teaching (M.A.T.), and Master of Education (M.Ed.).

On February 24, 2021, Salem College announced it would focus on preparing students in health leadership. According to the website, Salem College has transitioned to becoming "The nation’s only college dedicated to elevating and expanding the role of women in health leadership."

Traditional-age students are required to complete an internship and service learning project as part of the Salem Impact general education program.

Salem College has a cross-registration relationship with Wake Forest University, in which Salem undergraduates may take classes at Wake Forest's Reynolda Campus when a given course is not offered at Salem. (Similarly, Wake Forest undergraduates may enroll in Salem College courses when such a class is not available to them at Wake Forest.) Several Salem students are also members of Wake Forest's marching band.

Salem offers graduate degrees in education and school counseling.

Salem College is home to the Salem College Center for Women Writers. The center sponsors workshops and lectures, and hosts an annual writing contest.

== Student life ==
As of 2022, Salem College enrolled 469 students; this includes undergraduate students, graduate students in the field of education and adult continuing education students who live off-campus. Traditional aged undergraduates live on campus and off. A majority of students are from North Carolina but many represent Texas, Florida, Colorado, New York, New Jersey, and Maine. Salem College has an international student population from Nepal, Ethiopia, South Korea, Mexico, and Myanmar. Salem's diverse student population results in classes that are a rich mixture of traditional-aged and adult students, enhancing the learning environment.

Salem College shares its campus with Salem Academy, a residential high school for young women. They formerly shared buildings, but the academy was given its own buildings in the early 1900s.

Salem students participate in many unique traditional events including Fall Fest, the Sophomore/Senior banquet and Founders' Day Convocation. Students are required to attend one formal Student Government Association meeting per month and several formal convocations per year.

Salem students are also able to participate in Big/Little, a typically sorority based process where new students (Littles) pair themselves with an upperclassman (Bigs). This pairing is supposed to help incoming students adjust to life at Salem College.

Students are able to participate in over 40 clubs on campus, ranging from religious to political to environmental to social.

== Athletics ==
Salem athletics logo

Salem, known athletically as the Spirits, is a member of the NCAA Division III; and competes in the USA South Athletic Conference. Salem College did not move into the USA South Athletic conference until the 2016–2017 school year. Before the change, Salem's athletics teams were in the Great South Athletic Conference (GSAC). Currently, basketball, cross-country, soccer, softball, lacrosse, tennis, swim, and volleyball exist on campus as NCAA varsity sports. Salem's basketball team won the regional championship in February 2007. In 2013 Salem ended the season with the most wins in basketball history at 17–11. The soccer team won the regional championship in 2008, and has compiled a 49-18-3 record over the last four years.

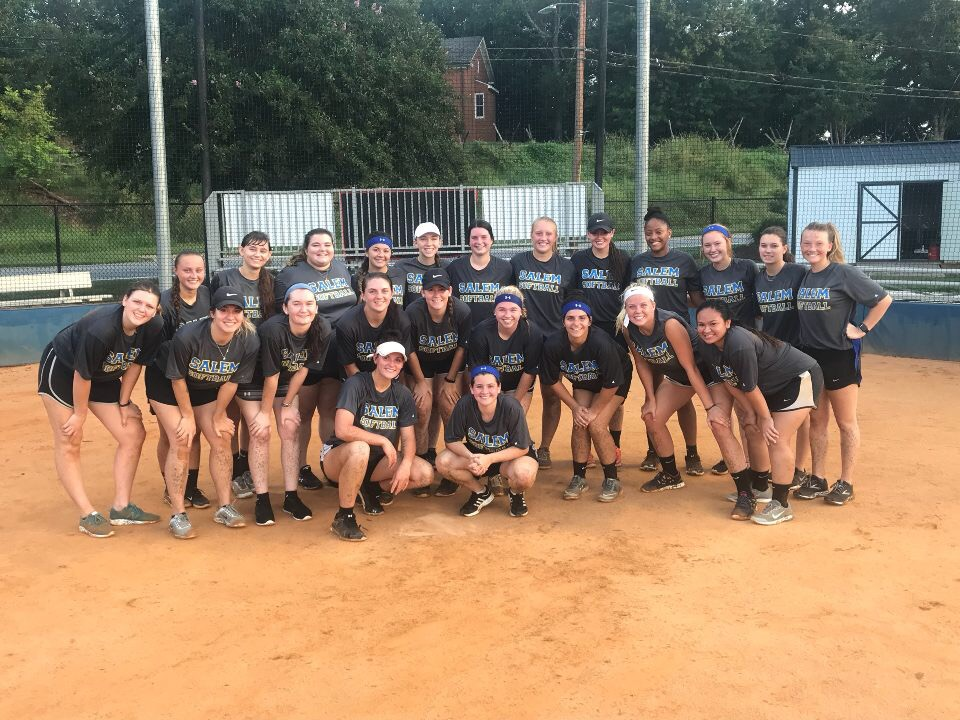
The softball team after their fall fitness test

In 2011 the soccer team was Meredith Classic runners-up. The Salem College soccer team in 2013 was one of only 88 teams in both men's and women's soccer for all NCAA divisions to earn the Team Ethics Award presented by the National Soccer Coaches Association of America. The cross country team would end the year in second place for 2013. The softball season for 2013 ended with best record (14-22) and best Great South record (9-7). The volleyball team went to the NCAA Tournament and won the Great South Athletic Conference Tournament for the first time. The Spirits had four players on the Great South All-Conference team, one player on the GSAC All-Freshmen team, and two players on the GSAC All-Academic Team.

Other team honors and awards include:

- NCAA Tournament Participants: Volleyball (2012)
- Great South Tournament Champions: Volleyball (2012)
- Great South Regular Season Champions: Soccer (2012)
- Great South Tournament Runner-Up: Basketball (2012–13), Soccer (2012)

== Alumnae ==
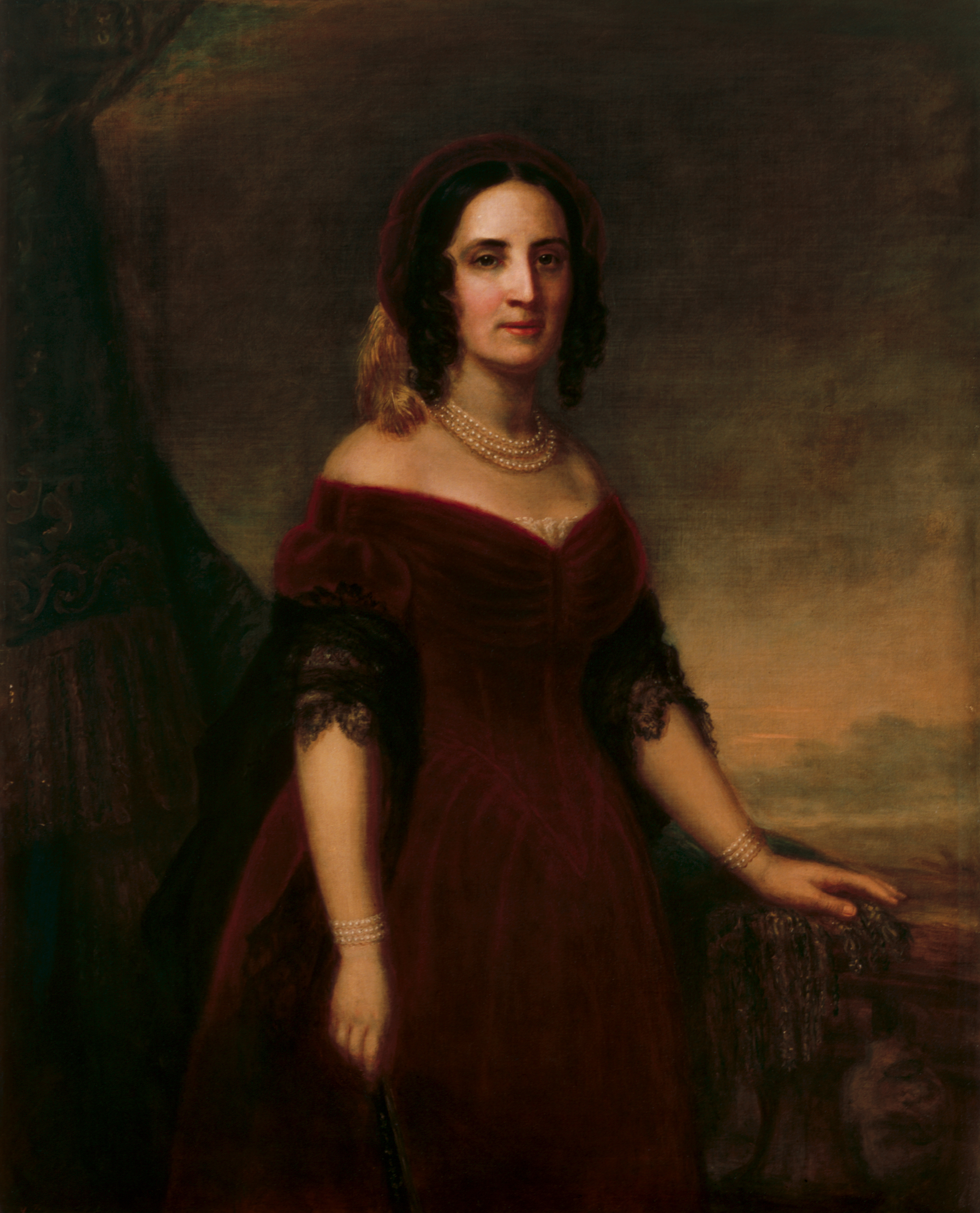
Portrait of Sarah Childress Polk

Among its alumnae is Sarah Childress Polk, wife of U.S. President James Knox Polk.

Emma Augusta Lehman (1841–1922), teacher, poet, naturalist and botanical collector graduated in 1864 and taught at Salem for 52 years.

Recent Salem alumnae include actress Celia Weston and Sarah Covington Fulcher, who currently holds at least two world records: the first woman and only the third person to complete a 2700-mile run across Australia, following up with the world's longest continuous solo run by any person.

=== List of notable alumnae ===
- Rachel Darden Davis, physician and politician
- Meribeth Dayme, public speaker and author
- Aisha Dew, politician
- Sarah Covington Fulcher, long-distance runner
- Corinne Hoch – Vice President General of the United Daughters of the Confederacy
- Julia C. Howard, politician
- Katherine G. Howard, government official
- Sarah Huston, newspaper editor and publisher
- Emma Augusta Lehman, academic
- Sheri Johnson, psychologist
- Lu Long Ogburn Medlin, Miss North Carolina 1951
- Cashavelly Morrison, singer-songwriter
- Sarah Childress Polk, First Lady of the United States
- Louise Siddall, organist and composer
- Dana Trent, author and minister
- Celia Weston, actress
- Beulah Zachary, television director and producer

== See also ==
- Salem Academy
- Adelaide Fries, author of the 1902 Historical Sketch of Salem Female Academy.
- Women's Colleges in the Southern United States
