= Women's College Coalition =

The Women's College Coalition (WCC) was founded in 1972 and describes itself as an "association of women’s colleges and universities that are two- and four-year, public and private, religiously affiliated and secular."

== Leadership ==
- Chair: Ann McElaney-Johnson, Mount Saint Mary's University
- President: Michele Ozumba, March 16, 2015
- Directors:
  - Mary Hinton, President, College of Saint Benedict
  - Carine Feyten, Chancellor, Texas Woman's University
  - Jacquelyn Litt, Dean, Secretary/Treasurer, Douglass Residential College at Rutgers University
  - Kimberly Cassidy, President, Bryn Mawr College
  - Lorraine Sterrit, President, Salem College
- Past Chairs:
  - Elizabeth Kiss, President, Agnes Scott College
  - Joanne V. Creighton, President, Mount Holyoke College
  - Elizabeth Fleming, President, Converse College
  - Nancy Oliver Gray, President, Hollins University
  - Sharon Latchaw Hirsch, President, Rosemont College
  - Patricia McGuire, President, Trinity Washington University
  - Mary Meehan, President, Alverno College

== Women's colleges and universities in the U.S. & Canada represented by WCC ==
- Agnes Scott College
- Alverno College
- Barnard College
- Bay Path University
- Bennett College for Women
- Brenau University
- Brescia University College (Canada)
- Bryn Mawr College
- Cedar Crest College
- College of Saint Benedict
- College of Saint Mary
- Cottey College
- Hollins University
- Mary Baldwin University
- Meredith College
- Moore College of Art and Design
- Mount Holyoke College
- Mount St. Mary's College
- Mount Saint Vincent University (Canada)*
- Notre Dame of Maryland University
- Russell Sage College of The Sage Colleges
- Saint Mary's College
- Salem College
- Scripps College
- Simmons College
- Smith College
- Spelman College
- St. Catherine University
- Stephens College
- Sweet Briar College
- Texas Woman's University*
- Trinity Washington University
- Wellesley College
- Wesleyan College

* Female-focused coeducational institutions

== See also ==
- List of women's universities and colleges in the United States
- Timeline of women's colleges in the United States
- Seven Sisters (colleges)
- Women's colleges in the Southern United States
- Women's colleges in the United States
