= Mississippi University for Women =

Public university in Columbus, Mississippi, US

- Former names: Industrial Institute and College for the Education of White Girls of Mississippi (1884–1920); Mississippi State College for Women (1920–1974)
- Type: Public liberal arts college
- Established: March 12, 1884; 142 years ago
- Parent institution: Mississippi Institutions of Higher Learning
- Accreditation: SACS
- Academic affiliations: COPLAC; Space-grant
- Endowment: $69 million (2024)
- President: Scott Tollison (interim)
- Provost: Kim Whitehead (interim)
- Academic staff: 208
- Administrative staff: 201
- Students: 2,371 (Fall 2025)
- Location: Columbus, Mississippi, United States; 33°29′35″N 88°25′7″W
- Campus: 114 acres (0.46 km^{2}); Remote town
- Other campuses: Tupelo
- Newspaper: MUW Spectator
- Colors: W blue and welty blue
- Nickname: Owls
- Sporting affiliations: NCAA Division III - SLIAC
- Mascot: Ody the Owl
- Website: muw.edu
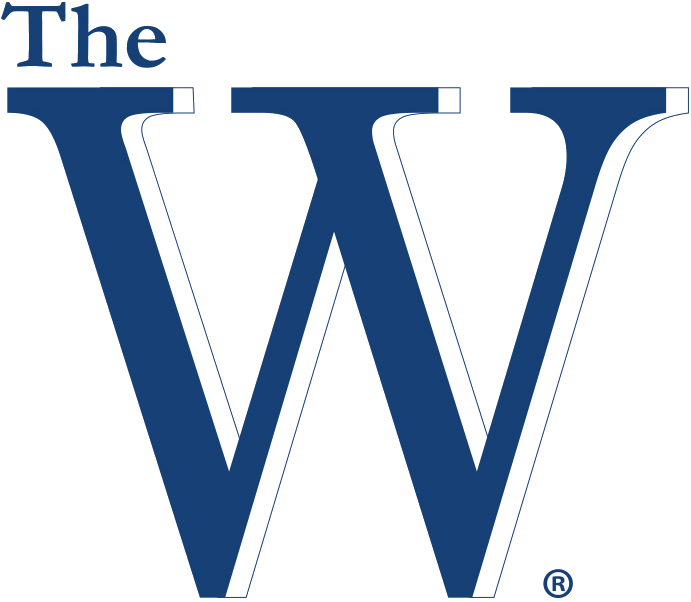

Mississippi University for Women (MUW or "The W") is a coeducational public university in Columbus, Mississippi. It was formerly named the "Industrial Institute and College for the Education of White Girls" and later the "Mississippi State College for Women". Men have been admitted to MUW since 1982 and as of 2022 made up 23 percent of the student body. As a public liberal arts college, MUW is one of 30 universities in the United States and Canada that comprise the Council of Public Liberal Arts Colleges.

== History ==
The institution, initially named the Mississippi Industrial Institute and College for the Education of White Girls, was created by an act of the Mississippi Legislature on March 12, 1884, for the dual purposes of providing a liberal arts education for white women and preparing them for employment. The "Industrial Institute and College" (II&C) was cofounded through the efforts of three Mississippi women – Sallie Eola Reneau, Annie Coleman Peyton, and Olivia Valentine Hastings. Upon its establishment, the II&C was the first public women's college in the United States. The II&C was located in Columbus on a campus formerly occupied by the Columbus Female Institute, a private college founded in 1847. The II&C's first session began on October 22, 1885, with an enrollment of approximately 250 students. Richard Watson Jones was selected by the State Institutions of Higher Learning board of trustees as the university's first president. President Jones also taught physics and chemistry at the institute, and he was joined that first year by 17 additional faculty members.

The name of the institution changed to Mississippi State College for Women in 1920 to reflect an emphasis on collegiate, rather than vocational, education.

In 1966, three local women from Hunt High School became the first black undergraduates at MSCW. They lived off campus, as the dormitories remained segregated until 1968. At the same time, three teachers from Hunt became the first graduate students at the school. The students were known collectively as The Fabulous Six.

In 1974, the name was changed to the Mississippi University for Women to reflect the expanded academic programs, including graduate studies. All other Mississippi state colleges were also designated universities at this time.

In 1982, the U.S. Supreme Court ruled in the case of Mississippi University for Women v. Hogan that the nursing school's single-sex admissions policies were in violation of the Equal Protection Clause of the Fourteenth Amendment. Following this decision, the Board of Trustees of State Institutions of Higher Learning ordered the university to change its policies to allow the admission of qualified men into all university programs. In 1988, the Board of Trustees reaffirmed the mission of MUW as an institution providing quality academic programs for all qualified students, with emphasis on distinctive opportunities for women.

In a 1997 article in Innovative Higher Education, Dale Thorn described MUW's successful attempt to avoid a merger with another institution and to remain a separate entity.

In 2009, President Claudia Limbert announced the possibility of changing the university's name to "Reneau University". The Mississippi State legislature did not approve the change.

On February 1, 2019, Nora Roberts Miller was inaugurated as the first alumna president of Mississippi University for Women. She was named the 15th president on September 15, 2018, by the State Institutions of Higher Learning board of trustees.

On January 8, 2024, the university announced a proposal to change its name to Mississippi Brightwell University. This proposal, which would not be made official until July 1, 2024, will require approval from Mississippi lawmakers before taking effect. According to the school's president, Nora Miller, this name is in reference to several aspects of MUW culture and tradition stating “The rebrand is intended to better mirror the University’s current vision, mission and the dynamic times we are living in, providing a more apt representation of our diverse and vibrant student body”. The name also reflects the school’s motto “We study for light to bless with light” which Miller states is indicative of school culture stating “Our motto epitomizes the enduring essence of a supportive, inclusive and empowered community. Our distinguished faculty – beacons of enlightenment and a wellspring of knowledge – collaborate with each of our students one-on-one.” The name also serves as a reference to the university’s honor societies, Torch and Lantern, and references a tradition in which nursing graduates would light a lantern at their pinning ceremony as a “source of reliability, goodwill and warmth”. After backlash from alumni and local residents, Miller announced that the naming task force would reconvene to choose another name.

On February 13, 2024, Miller announced via livestream from the front steps of Poindexter Hall that the task force had selected a new name: Wynbridge State University of Mississippi. However, on February 21, Miller released a statement on the university's website announcing that the name change initiative had been halted, stating in part, "While we remain committed to a future name change, we will regroup and re-examine our processes, ways of engaging with our alumni base, and the many needs surrounding finding a name that captures the unique history as well as the contemporary qualities of our university."

== Rankings ==
Undergraduate demographics as of Fall 2023
Race and ethnicity	Total
White	57%
Black	38%
American Indian/Alaska Native	1%
Asian	1%
Hispanic	1%
Economic diversity
Low-income (Note: The percentage of students who received an income-based federal Pell grant intended for low-income students.)	51%
Affluent (Note: The percentage of students who are a part of the American middle class at the bare minimum.)	49%

Academic rankings

Regional
- U.S. News & World Report: 34 (tie)

In 2022, U.S. News & World Report ranked The W 15th as a best value among public Southern regional universities and 18th among the top public schools. The university also lands in the top 10 on the social mobility scale.

MUW campus

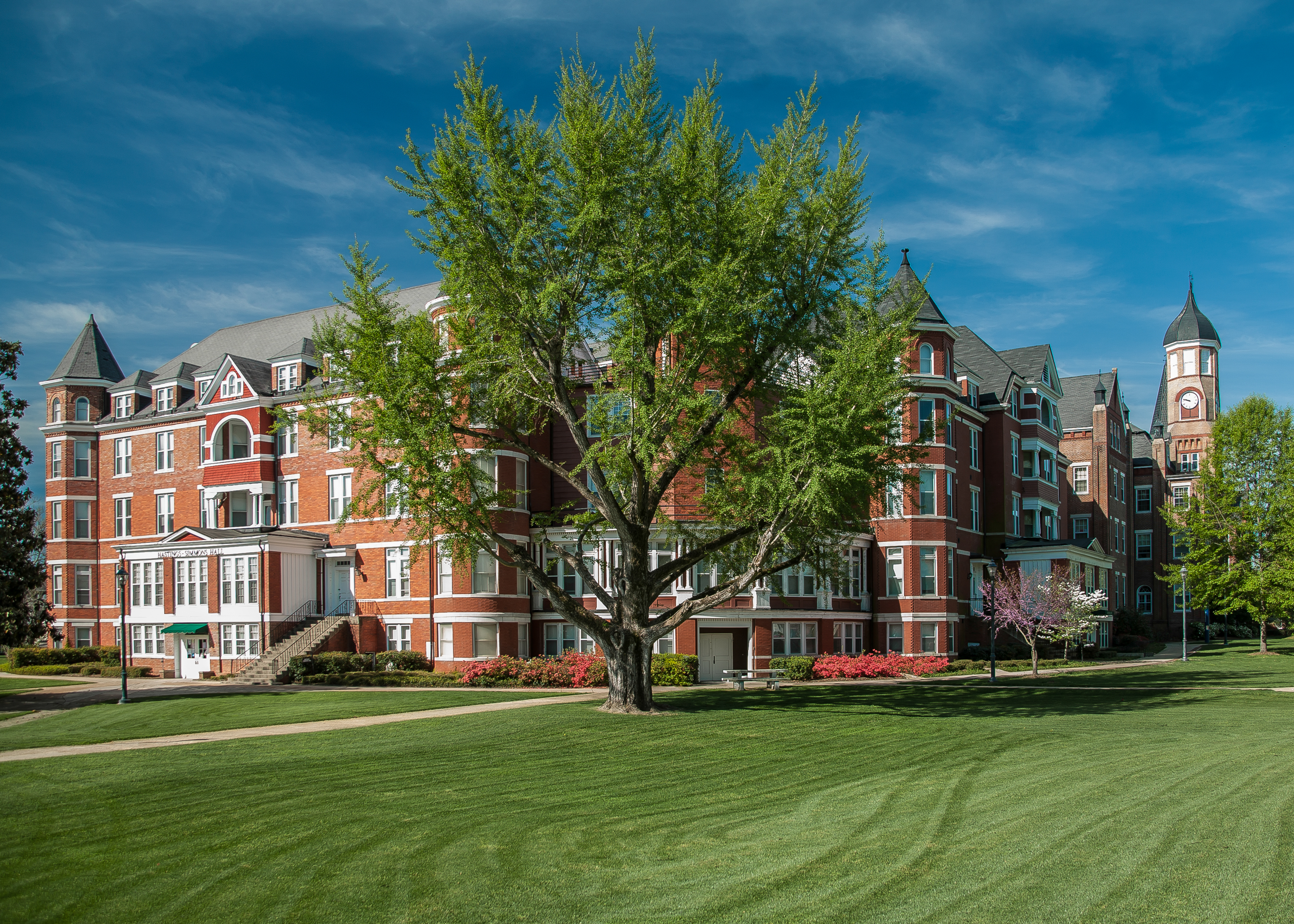
Front view of the campus

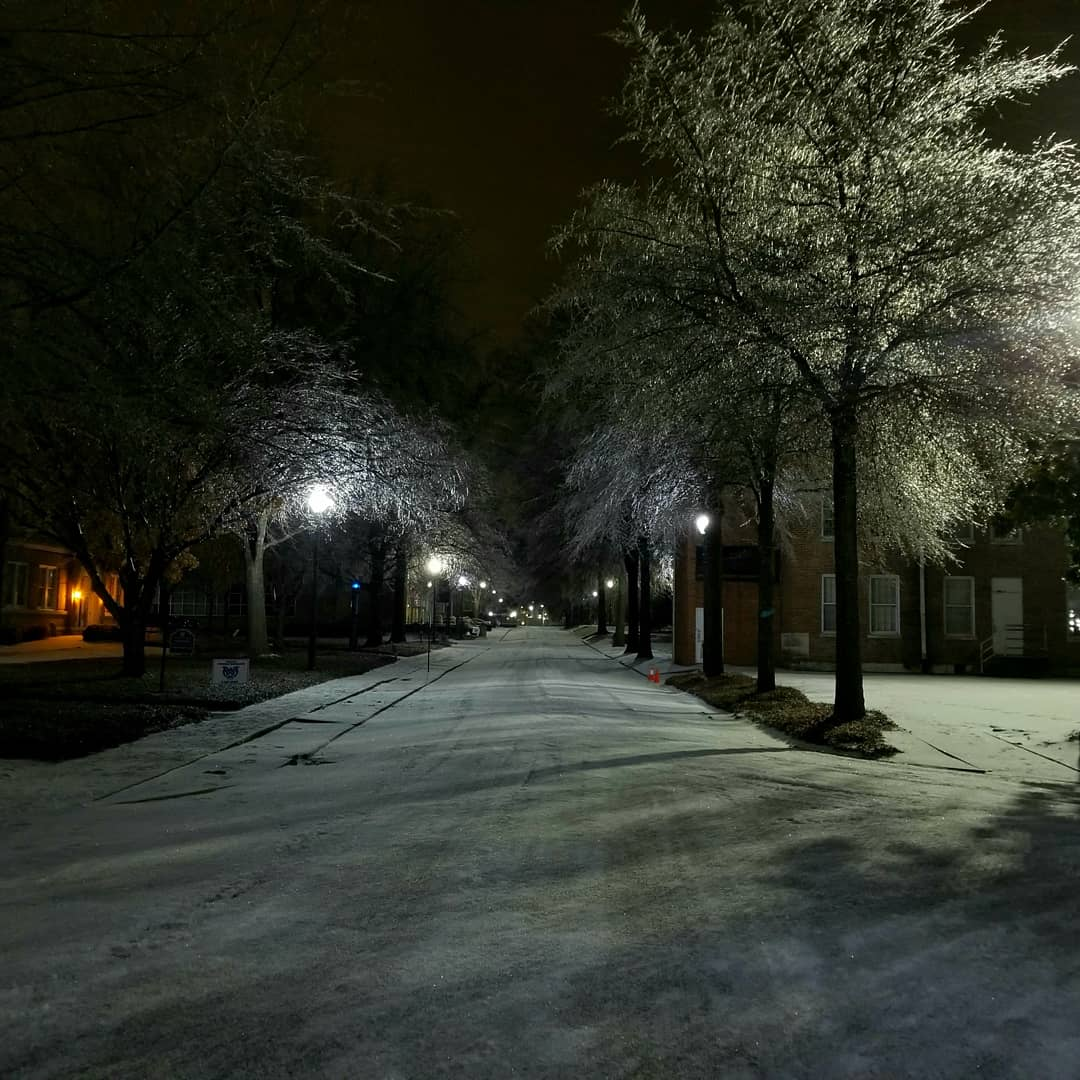
Looking north on Serenade Drive

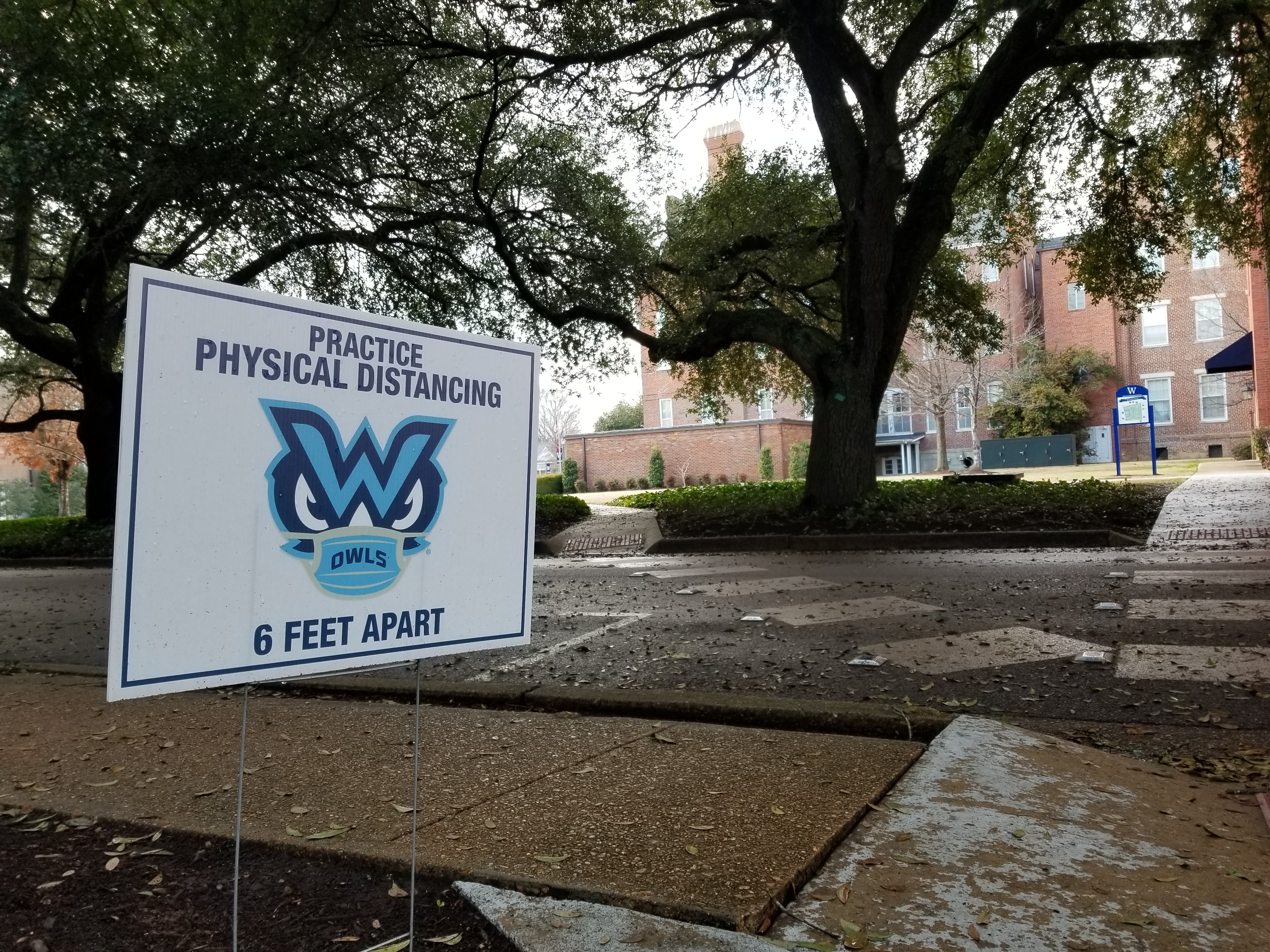
Physical distance sign behind Callaway Hall

== Athletics ==
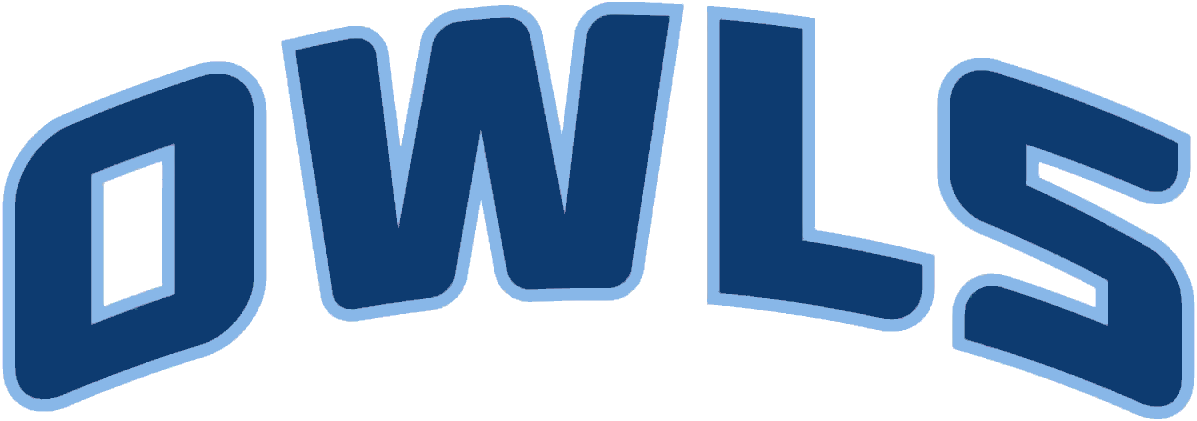
MUW athletics wordmark

The MUW athletic teams are called the Owls (formerly known as the Blues). The university is a member in the NCAA Division III ranks, primarily competing in the St. Louis Intercollegiate Athletic Conference (SLIAC) since the 2022–23 academic year. The Owls are also a member of the United States Collegiate Athletic Association (USCAA). The program competed as an NCAA D-III Independent from 2019–20 to 2021–22. Previously, the teams participated in the NCAA Division II ranks, primarily competing in the Gulf South Conference (GSC), from 1993–94 to 2002–03. At the end of that school year, the university dropped its athletics program.

MUW competes in 15 intercollegiate varsity sports: Men's sports include baseball, basketball, cross country, golf, soccer, tennis, and track & field; while women's sports include basketball, cross country, golf, soccer, softball, tennis, track & field, and volleyball.

=== History ===
Originally a women's institution with only women's athletics, it became a co-educational university in 1982, however men's sports were not introduced until the 2017-2018 school year. In 2002, MUW canceled all athletic programs due to the damage from a November 10, 2002, F3 tornado. The tornado ripped through the MUW campus, particularly on the southern half of campus. Nearly half (26 of 60) buildings on campus were damaged, some heavily; the Edna Pohl gymnasium was leveled.

Beginning the 2017-2018 school year MUW reintroduced their athletic program and joined the USCAA. MUW's newly re-instated program include women's and men's sports with baseball, cross country, and soccer; basketball, and golf being offered beginning that year (2017). Tennis began the following year (2018-2019), and track and field the year after(2019-2020).

In June 2021, MUW was admitted to the SLIAC as a full member to begin play during the 2022–23 academic year. MUW became an active Division III member that year.

=== Accomplishments ===
MUW (then known as Mississippi State College for Women) won the 1971 national championship in women's basketball, defeating West Chester State, 57–55. In the 1972 AIAW National Basketball Championship, MSCW finished fourth, losing in the semifinals to the legendary Immaculata team.

In 1971, Mississippi State College for Women won the intercollegiate women's basketball national championship (the third ever held). In March 2019, the women's basketball team won the USCAA National Championship after defeating the University of Maine at Fort Kent.

== Notable alumni ==
Notable MUW alumni include:

- Tina Renee Johns Benkiser, chairman of the Republican Party of Texas, 2003–2009
- Dorothy Vredenburgh Bush, secretary of the Democratic National Committee (1944–1989) and the youngest person and first woman to be elected as an officer of either the Democratic or Republican party
- Kay Beevers Cobb, Mississippi Supreme Court Justice, retired
- Bertha V. Fontaine, home economist
- Chris Fryar, musician and drummer of Zac Brown Band
- Susan Golden, National Academy of Sciences member and Professor of Molecular Biology at University of California, San Diego
- Laverne Greene-Leech, one of three African-American students to desegregate Mississippi State College for Women (now MUW) in 1966
- Elizabeth Lee Hazen, co-discoverer of nystatin
- Valerie Jaudon, artist
- Emma Sadler Moss (1898–1970), pathologist
- Lenore Prather, first female Mississippi Supreme Court Justice
- Toni Seawright, first African-American to earn a degree in music at MUW, first African-American to hold a recital in vocal music at MUW, first African-American Miss Mississippi (1987), 4th runner-up to Miss America (1987)
- Connie Simpson, celebrity nanny
- Doris Taylor, scientist known for achievements in stem cell research
- Eudora Welty, Pulitzer Prize-winning author
- Elizabeth H. West, librarian, first woman to head the Texas State Library, first librarian of Texas Tech University, co-founder and first President of the Southwestern Library Association
- Blanche Colton Williams, author and first editor of the O. Henry Prize Stories
- Linkie Marais, television chef and finalist from Food Network Star Season 8

== See also ==
- List of current and historical women's universities and colleges in the United States
- Timeline of women's colleges in the United States
- Mississippi School for Mathematics and Science
- Women's colleges in the United States
- AIAW Champions
