= Mississippi University for Women v. Hogan =

- Supreme Court of the United States

Argued March 22, 1982 Decided July 1, 1982
- Full case name: Mississippi University for Women v. Hogan
- Citations: 458 U.S. 718 (more) 102 S. Ct. 3331; 73 L. Ed. 2d 1090; 1982 U.S. LEXIS 157; 50 U.S.L.W. 5068; 29 Empl. Prac. Dec. (CCH) ¶ 32,868

Case history
- Prior: Cert. to the United States Court of Appeals for the Fifth Circuit

Holding
- The exclusion of men from enrollment in Mississippi University for Women's nursing school violated the Fourteenth Amendment's Equal Protection Clause.

Court membership
- Chief Justice Warren E. Burger Associate Justices William J. Brennan Jr. · Byron White; Thurgood Marshall · Harry Blackmun; Lewis F. Powell Jr. · William Rehnquist; John P. Stevens · Sandra Day O'Connor

Case opinions
- Majority: O'Connor, joined by Brennan, White, Marshall, Stevens
- Dissent: Burger
- Dissent: Blackmun
- Dissent: Powell, joined by Rehnquist

Laws applied
- U.S. Const. amend. XIV

Mississippi University for Women v. Hogan, 458 U.S. 718 (1982), is a landmark decision of the Supreme Court of the United States, decided 5–4, which ruled that the single-sex admissions policy of the Mississippi University for Women violated the Equal Protection Clause of the Fourteenth Amendment to the United States Constitution.

== Background of the case ==
The Mississippi University for Women was established in 1884 in Columbus, Mississippi and originally called the Mississippi Industrial Institute and College for the Education of White Girls, later changed to Mississippi State College for Women. It was the first state-supported women's college in the United States. In 1971, the School of Nursing was established, initially offering a two-year associate's degree, and later four-year baccalaureate degree and graduate degree programs.

In 1979, Joe Hogan, a registered nurse and nursing supervisor in Columbus who did not have a baccalaureate degree in nursing, applied for admission to the MUW School of Nursing's baccalaureate program. Although he was otherwise qualified, he was denied admission to the School of Nursing. School officials provided the option to audit courses in which he was interested, but he could not enroll for credit because he was male. Hogan could have attended classes and received credit in one of Mississippi's two public, coeducational programs leading to a Bachelor of Science in Nursing, but these were at the University of Southern Mississippi in Hattiesburg (178 miles from Columbus) and the University of Mississippi in Oxford (114 miles from Columbus). Hogan filed an action in the United States District Court for the Northern District of Mississippi, claiming the single-sex admissions policy of MUW's School of Nursing violated the Equal Protection Clause of the Fourteenth Amendment, and seeking injunctive and declaratory relief as well as compensatory damages.

== Case history ==
The District Court ruled in favor of the Mississippi University for Women, concluding that maintenance of MUW as a single-sex school bears a rational relationship to the State's legitimate interest "in providing the greatest practical range of educational opportunities for its female student population." The court held that the admissions policy was not arbitrary: providing single-sex schools is consistent with a respected, though by no means universally accepted, educational theory that single-sex education affords unique benefits to students. Stating that the case presented no issue of fact, the court informed Hogan that it would enter summary judgment dismissing his claim unless he tendered a factual issue. When Hogan offered no further evidence, the District Court entered summary judgment in favor of the State.

The Court of Appeals for the Fifth Circuit reversed, holding that because the admissions policy discriminated on the basis of sex, a rational relationship test was improper, and the proper test was whether the sex-based admissions policy was substantially related to an important governmental objective. The court, while recognizing that the State has a significant interest in providing educational opportunities for all its citizens, found that the State failed to show that providing a unique educational opportunity for females but not for males had any substantial relationship to that interest.

== Opinion of the Court ==
The Supreme Court's ruling did not require that the entire university become coeducational; however, the Board of Trustees of Mississippi State Institutions of Higher Learning ordered the university to change its policies to allow the admission of qualified males into all university programs. By the 2020-2021 academic year, one in five students were men.

The Court's ruling also did not require the school to change the name of the school, and as a result the school remains "Mississippi University for Women". Suits have been filed against the university to change the name claiming that its name and mission discourage males from applying for admission. These suits were dismissed as groundless and had no effect on the name.

In 2002, the administration of the university considered changing the name and pursued efforts to do so despite opposition, particularly from alumnae. In her convocation speech on August 11, 2008, President Limbert announced a new proposal to remove "women" from the university's name which was abandoned.

== See also ==
- Gender equality
- List of gender equality lawsuits
- List of United States Supreme Court cases, volume 458
