= List of Kappa Pi chapters =

Kappa Pi is an international art honor society was founded in 1911 at the University of Kentucky. In the following list, active chapters are indicated in bold and inactive chapters are in italics.

Chapter	Charter date and range	Institution	Location	Status	Ref.
Alpha	1911–xxxx ?	University of Kentucky	Lexington, Kentucky	Inactive	
Beta	1914–xxxx ?	Centre College	Danville, Kentucky	Inactive	
Gamma	1914–xxxx ?	Columbia University	New York City, New York	Inactive	
Delta	1914–1916	Vanderbilt University and George Peabody College for Teachers	Nashville, Tennessee	Inactive	(Note: When Kappa Pi's first National Chapter Roll was published in 1916, both the Delta and Epsilon chapters had gone inactive.)
Epsilon	1914–1916	Purdue University	West Lafayette, Indiana	Inactive	
Zeta	1918–xxxx ?	University of Tennessee	Knoxville, Tennessee	Inactive	
Eta	1923–xxxx ?	University of Chicago	Chicago, Illinois	Inactive	
**Theta**	1925	Birmingham–Southern College	Birmingham, Alabama	Active	
Gamma Phi first	1928–19xx ?	Professional chapter for photographic artists		Inactive	
**Iota**	1928	Iowa Wesleyan University	Mount Pleasant, Iowa	Inactive	
Kappa	1928–xxxx ?	Lindenwood University	St. Charles, Missouri	Inactive	
Lambda	1928–xxxx ?	Oklahoma City University	Oklahoma City, Oklahoma	Inactive	
Mu	1932–xxxx ?	Western New Mexico University	Silver City, New Mexico	Inactive	
Nu	1937–xxxx ?	Emporia State University	Emporia, Kansas	Inactive	
Xi	1937–xxxx ?	University of Montevallo	Montevallo, Alabama	Inactive	
Omicron	1937–xxxx ?	University of Montana Western	Dillon, Montana	Inactive	
Pi	1937–xxxx ?	University of Georgia	Athens, Georgia	Inactive	
**Rho**	1938	Huntingdon College	Montgomery, Alabama	Active	
Sigma	1938–xxxx ?	Mississippi University for Women	Montgomery, Alabama	Inactive	
Tau	1938–xxxx ?	Emporia State University	Emporia, Kansas	Inactive	
Upsilon	1938–xxxx ?	Douglass Residential College	New Brunswick, New Jersey	Inactive	
Chi	1939–xxxx ?	Eastern Illinois University	Charleston, Illinois	Inactive	
Gamma Phi second	1940–19xx ?,	Photographic chapter	Mt. Pleasant, Iowa	Inactive	
Phi	1940–xxxx ?	University of Central Oklahoma	Edmond, Oklahoma	Inactive	
Psi	1940–xxxx ?	Southern Illinois University Carbondale	Carbondale, Illinois	Inactive	
Omega	1940–xxxx ?	Indiana State University	Terre Haute, Indiana	Inactive	
Alpha Alpha	1940–xxxx ?	Samford University	Homewood, Alabama	Inactive	
Alpha Beta	1941–xxxx ?	Central Washington University	Ellensburg, Washington	Inactive	
Alpha Gamma	1941–xxxx ?	Northern Illinois University	DeKalb, Illinois	Inactive	
Alpha Delta	1941–xxxx ?	University of Arkansas	Fayetteville, Arkansas	Inactive	
Alpha Epsilon	1943–xxxx ?	University of Mary Hardin–Baylor	Belton, Texas	Inactive	
Alpha Zeta	1943–xxxx ?	Joslyn Art Museum	Omaha, Nebraska	Inactive	
**Alpha Eta**	1944	Florida Southern College	Lakeland, Florida	Active	
Alpha Theta	1944–xxxx ?	Winthrop University	Rock Hill, South Carolina	Inactive	
Alpha Iota	1944–xxxx ?	DePauw University	Greencastle, Indiana	Inactive	
Alpha Kappa	1945–xxxx ?	Baylor University	Waco, Texas	Inactive	
Alpha Lambda	1945–xxxx ?	Sam Houston State University	Huntsville, Texas	Inactive	
Alpha Mu	1945–xxxx ?	University of Minnesota Duluth	Duluth, Minnesota	Inactive	
Alpha Nu	1945–xxxx ?	Albion College	Albion, Michigan	Inactive	
Alpha Xi	1945–xxxx ?	Kansas Wesleyan University	Salina, Kansas	Inactive	
Alpha Omicron	1946–xxxx ?	Georgetown College	Georgetown, Kentucky	Inactive	
Alpha Pi	1946–xxxx ?	Texas State University	San Marcos, Texas	Inactive	
Alpha Rho	1946–xxxx ?	Brenau University	Gainesville, Georgia	Inactive	
**Alpha Sigma**	1946	Our Lady of the Lake University	San Antonio, Texas	Active	
Alpha Tau	May 1946–197x, September 2016–20xx ?	Stetson University	DeLand, Florida	Inactive	(Note: Chapter originally formed by absorbing the Hatter Art Club, established in 1935.)
Alpha Upsilon	1946–xxxx ?	Winona State University	Winona, Minnesota	Inactive	
Alpha Phi	1946–xxxx ?	Fashion Academy, New York City	New York City, New York	Inactive	
Alpha Chi	1947–xxxx ?	Black Hills State University	Spearfish, South Dakota	Inactive	
Alpha Psi	1947–xxxx ?	University of South Carolina	Columbia, South Carolina	Inactive	
Alpha Omega	1947–xxxx ?	Wichita State University	Wichita, Kansas	Inactive	
Alpha Alpha Alpha	1947–xxxx ?	Western Oregon University	Monmouth, Oregon	Inactive	
Alpha Alpha Beta	1947–xxxx ?	Oklahoma Baptist University	Shawnee, Oklahoma	Inactive	
Alpha Alpha Gamma	1947–xxxx ?	Akron Art Institute	Akron, Ohio	Inactive	
Alpha Alpha Delta	1948–xxxx ?	Western Colorado University	Gunnison, Colorado	Inactive	
Alpha Alpha Epsilon	1948–xxxx ?	Southwestern College	Winfield, Kansas	Inactive	
Alpha Alpha Zeta	1948–xxxx ?	Carthage College	Kenosha, Wisconsin	Inactive	
Alpha Alpha Eta	1948–xxxx ?	University of Southern California	Los Angeles, California	Inactive	
Alpha Alpha Theta	1948–xxxx ?	University of Tampa	Tampa, Florida	Inactive	
Alpha Alpha Iota	1948–xxxx ?	University of Miami	Coral Gables, Florida	Inactive	
Alpha Alpha Kappa	1948–xxxx ?	Arkansas State University	Jonesboro, Arkansas	Inactive	
Alpha Alpha Lambda	1949–xxxx ?	Southwestern Oklahoma State University	Sayre, Oklahoma	Inactive	
Alpha Alpha Mu	1949–xxxx ?	Eastern Washington University	Cheney, Washington	Inactive	
Alpha Alpha Nu	1949–xxxx ?	University of Texas at El Paso	El Paso, Texas	Inactive	
Alpha Alpha Xi	1949–xxxx ?	Phillips University	Enid, Oklahoma	Inactive	
Alpha Alpha Omicron	1949–xxxx ?	Eastern New Mexico University	Portales, New Mexico	Inactive	
Alpha Alpha Pi	1949–xxxx ?	Oregon State University	Corvallis, Oregon	Inactive	
Alpha Alpha Rho	1949–xxxx ?	University of Southern Mississippi	Hattiesburg, Mississippi	Inactive	
Alpha Alpha Sigma	1950–xxxx ?	New Mexico Highlands University	Las Vegas, New Mexico	Inactive	
Alpha Alpha Tau	1950–xxxx ?	West Liberty University	West Liberty, West Virginia	Inactive	
Alpha Alpha Upsilon	1950–xxxx ?	St. Cloud State University	St. Cloud, Minnesota	Inactive	
Alpha Alpha Phi	1950–xxxx ?	University of North Carolina at Chapel Hill	Chapel Hill, North Carolina	Inactive	
Alpha Alpha Chi	1950–xxxx ?	Murray State University	Murray, Kentucky	Inactive	
Alpha Alpha Psi	1950–xxxx ?	Eastern Kentucky University	Richmond, Kentucky	Inactive	
Alpha Alpha Omega		not assigned		Inactive	
Beta Alpha	1950–xxxx ?	Baker University	Baldwin City, Kansas	Inactive	
Beta Beta	1951–xxxx ?	University of Nebraska at Kearney	Kearney, Nebraska	Inactive	
Beta Gamma	1951–xxxx ?	Southeast Missouri State University	Cape Girardeau, Missouri	Inactive	
Beta Delta	1951–xxxx ?	University of Alabama	Tuscaloosa, Alabama	Inactive	
Beta Epsilon	1951–xxxx ?	University of North Texas	Denton, Texas	Inactive	
Beta Zeta	1951–xxxx ?	Heidelberg University	Tiffin, Ohio	Inactive	
Beta Eta	1951–xxxx ?	Marshall University	Huntington, West Virginia	Inactive	
Beta Theta	1952–xxxx ?	Wayne State University	Detroit, Michigan	Inactive	
Beta Iota	1952–xxxx ?	Stephen F. Austin State University	Nacogdoches, Texas	Inactive	
Beta Kappa	1952–xxxx ?	Queens College, City University of New York	Queens, New York City, New York	Inactive	
Beta Lambda	1954–xxxx ?	Hofstra University	Nassau County, New York	Inactive	
Beta Mu	1954–xxxx ?	University of Maryland Eastern Shore	Princess Anne, Maryland	Inactive	
Beta Nu	1954–xxxx ?	Hunter College	New York City, New York	Inactive	
Beta Xi	1954–xxxx ?	University of Evansville	Evansville, Indiana	Inactive	
Beta Omicron	1954–xxxx ?	Lewis & Clark College	Portland, Oregon	Inactive	
Beta Pi	1954–xxxx ?	West Texas A&M University	Canyon, Texas	Inactive	
Beta Rho	1954–xxxx ?	University of Northern Iowa	Cedar Falls, Iowa	Inactive	
Beta Sigma	1954–xxxx ?	Drew University	Madison, New Jersey	Inactive	
**Beta Tau**	1954	Lamar University	Beaumont, Texas	Active	
Beta Upsilon	1955–xxxx ?	Harris–Stowe State University	St. Louis, Missouri	Inactive	
Beta Phi	1955–xxxx ?	Texas Wesleyan University	Fort Worth, Texas	Inactive	
**Beta Chi**	April 13, 1956	Hardin–Simmons University	Abilene, Texas	Active	
Beta Psi	1956–xxxx ?	Concord University	Athens, West Virginia	Inactive	
Beta Omega	1956–xxxx ?	Seattle Pacific University	Seattle, Washington	Inactive	
**Gamma Alpha**	1956	Northwest Missouri State University	Maryville, Missouri	Active	
Gamma Beta	1957–xxxx ?	Fairmont State University	Fairmont, West Virginia	Inactive	
Gamma Gamma	1957–xxxx ?	Union College	Barbourville, Kentucky	Inactive	
Gamma Delta	1957–xxxx ?	University of Wisconsin–Eau Claire	Eau Claire, Wisconsin	Inactive	
Gamma Epsilon	1957–xxxx ?	University of Houston	Houston, Texas	Inactive	
**Gamma Zeta**	1958	Hastings College	Hastings, Nebraska	Active	
Gamma Eta	1958–xxxx ?	Chadron State College	Chadron, Nebraska	Inactive	
Gamma Theta	1958–xxxx ?	Montclair State University	Montclair, New Jersey	Inactive	
Gamma Iota	1959–xxxx ?	Eastern Oregon University	La Grande, Oregon	Inactive	
**Gamma Kappa**	1959	James Madison University	Harrisonburg, Virginia	Active	
Gamma Lambda	1959–xxxx ?	Abilene Christian University	Abilene, Texas	Inactive	
**Gamma Mu**	1959	Northwestern State University	Natchitoches, Louisiana	Active	
Gamma Nu	1959–xxxx ?	University of Louisiana at Lafayette	Lafayette, Louisiana	Inactive	
Gamma Xi	1959–xxxx ?	Louisiana College	Pineville, Louisiana	Inactive	
Gamma Omicron	1959–xxxx ?	Centenary College of Louisiana	Shreveport, Louisiana	Active	
Gamma Pi	1960–xxxx ?	Western Kentucky University	Bowling Green, Kentucky	Inactive	
Gamma Rho	1960–xxxx ?	Northwestern Oklahoma State University	Alva, Oklahoma	Inactive	
**Gamma Sigma**	1960	Adelphi University	Garden City, New York	Active	
Gamma Tau	1961–xxxx ?	California State University, Los Angeles	Los Angeles, California	Inactive	
Gamma Upsilon	1961–xxxx ?	University of Alaska Fairbanks	Los Angeles, California	Inactive	
Gamma Chi	1961–xxxx ?	Alaska Pacific University	Anchorage, Alaska	Inactive	
Gamma Psi	1961–xxxx ?	San Diego State University	San Diego, California	Inactive	
Gamma Omega	1961–xxxx ?	West Virginia Wesleyan College	Buckhannon, West Virginia	Inactive	
**Delta Alpha**	1961	University of Louisiana at Monroe	Monroe, Louisiana	Active	
Delta Beta	1961–xxxx ?	Mississippi College	Clinton, Mississippi	Inactive	
Delta Gamma	1961–xxxx ?	Minnesota State University, Mankato	Mankato, Minnesota	Inactive	
**Delta Delta**	1962	Western Illinois University	Macomb, Illinois	Active	
Delta Epsilon	1962–xxxx ?	University of Bridgeport	Bridgeport, Connecticut	Inactive	
Delta Zeta	1962–xxxx ?	State University of New York at New Paltz	New Paltz, New York	Inactive	
Delta Eta	1963–xxxx ?	Montana State University–Northern	Havre, Montana	Inactive	
Delta Theta	1963–xxxx ?	North Carolina A&T State University	Greensboro, North Carolina	Inactive	
Delta Iota	1963–xxxx ?	Morehead State University	Morehead, Kentucky	Inactive	
Delta Kappa	1963–xxxx ?	University of the Philippines Diliman	Quezon City, Philippines	Inactive	
**Delta Lambda**	1963	Delta State University	Cleveland, Mississippi	Active	
Delta Mu	1963–xxxx ?	University of North Alabama	Florence, Alabama	Inactive	
Delta Nu	1964–xxxx ?	Belhaven University	Jackson, Mississippi	Inactive	
Delta Xi	1964–xxxx ?	Arkansas Tech University	Russellville, Arkansas	Inactive	
Delta Omicron	1964–xxxx ?	LIU Post	Brookville, New York	Inactive	
Delta Pi	1965–xxxx ?	University of North Carolina at Asheville	Asheville, North Carolina	Inactive	
Delta Rho	1965–xxxx ?	Ottawa University	Ottawa, Kansas	Inactive	
Delta Sigma	1965–xxxx ?	Keuka College	Keuka Park, New York	Inactive	
Delta Tau	1966–xxxx ?	Alabama State University	Montgomery, Alabama	Inactive	
**Delta Upsilon**	1966–xxxx ?	Troy University	Troy, Alabama	Active	
Delta Phi	1966–xxxx ?	College of Mount Saint Vincent	New York City, New York	Inactive	
Delta Chi	1967–xxxx ?	Waynesburg University	Waynesburg, Pennsylvania	Inactive	
Delta Omega	1967–xxxx ?	Louisiana Tech University	Ruston, Louisiana	Inactive	
Epsilon Alpha	1967–xxxx ?	Baldwin Wallace University	Berea, Ohio	Inactive	
Epsilon Beta		not assigned		Inactive	
Epsilon Gamma	1967–xxxx ?	Middle Tennessee State University	Murfreesboro, Tennessee	Inactive	
Epsilon Delta	1967–xxxx ?	Minot State University	Minot, North Dakota	Inactive	
Epsilon Epsilon		not assigned		Inactive	
Epsilon Zeta	1968–xxxx ?	Dickinson State University	Dickinson, North Dakota	Inactive	
Epsilon Eta	1968–xxxx ?	University of Central Arkansas	onway, Arkansas	Inactive	
**Epsilon Theta**	1968	McMurry University	Abilene, Texas	Active	
Epsilon Iota	1968–xxxx ?	Harding University	Searcy, Arkansas	Inactive	
Epsilon Kappa	1968–xxxx ?	Montreat College	Montreat, North Carolina	Inactive	
Epsilon Lambda	1968–xxxx ?	University of Wyoming	Laramie, Wyoming	Inactive	
Epsilon Mu	1968–xxxx ?	Boise State University	Boise, Idaho	Inactive	
Epsilon Nu	1968–xxxx ?	Parsons College	Fairfield, Iowa	Inactive	
Epsilon Xi	1968–xxxx ?	John F. Kennedy College	Wahoo, Nebraska	Inactive	
Epsilon Omicron	1969–xxxx ?	Lehman College	Bronx, New York	Inactive	
Epsilon Pi	1969–xxxx ?	Carson–Newman University	Jefferson City, Tennessee	Inactive	
Epsilon Rho	1970–xxxx ?	Friends University	Wichita, Kansas	Inactive	
**Epsilon Sigma**	1970	Ohio Northern University	Ada, Ohio	Active	
Epsilon Tau	1972–xxxx ?	University of Alabama in Huntsville	Huntsville, Alabama	Inactive	
Epsilon Upsilon	1972–xxxx ?	St. Mary's College of Maryland	St. Mary's City, Maryland	Inactive	
Epsilon Phi	1975–xxxx ?	Mississippi State University	Starkville, Mississippi	Inactive	
**Epsilon Chi**	1973	Bethany College	Bethany, West Virginia	Active	
Epsilon Psi	1976–xxxx ?	University of Mississippi	Oxford, Mississippi	Inactive	
Epsilon Omega	1974–xxxx ?	Instituto Allende	San Miguel de Allende, Mexico	Inactive	
Zeta Alpha	1976–xxxx ?	Austin College	Sherman, Texas	Inactive	
Zeta Beta	1976–xxxx ?	Annhurst College	South Woodstock, Connecticut	Inactive	
Zeta Gamma	1977–xxxx ?	Union University	Jackson, Tennessee	Inactive	
Zeta Delta	1977–xxxx ?	Oklahoma Christian University	Oklahoma City, Oklahoma	Inactive	
Zeta Epsilon	1979–xxxx ?	Brescia University	Owensboro, Kentucky	Inactive	
Zeta Zeta	1980–xxxx ?	University of Texas at Austin	Austin, Texas	Inactive	
Zeta Eta	1980–xxxx ?	Kilgore College	Kilgore, Texas	Inactive	
Zeta Theta	1980–xxxx ?	Bellevue University	Bellevue, Nebraska	Inactive	
Zeta Iota	1980–xxxx ?	Meridian Community College	Meridian, Mississippi	Inactive	
Zeta Kappa	1982–xxxx ?	Nebraska Wesleyan University	Lincoln, Nebraska	Inactive	
Zeta Lambda	1983–xxxx ?	Salisbury University	Salisbury, Maryland	Inactive	
Zeta Mu	1983–xxxx ?	Jacksonville University	Jacksonville, Florida	Inactive	
Zeta Nu	1984–xxxx ?	Palm Beach State College	Lake Worth, Florida	Inactive	
**Zeta Xi**	1985	Sul Ross State University	Alpine, Texas	Active	
**Zeta Omicron**	1986	Marywood University	Scranton, Pennsylvania	Active	
Zeta Pi	1987–xxxx ?	Maryville College	Maryville, Tennessee	Inactive	
Zeta Rho	1988–xxxx ?	Joliet Junior College	Joliet, Illinois	Inactive	
**Zeta Sigma**	1989	Longwood University	Farmville, Virginia	Active	
Zeta Tau		not assigned		Inactive	
Zeta Upsilon		not assigned		Inactive	
**Zeta Phi**	1990	Angelo State University	San Angelo, Texas	Active	
**Zeta Chi**	1990	Liberty University	Lynchburg, Virginia	Active	
**Zeta Psi**	1991	Moravian University	Bethlehem, Pennsylvania	Active	
**Zeta Omega**	1994	William Carey University	Gulfport, Mississippi	Inactive	
Zeta Alpha Alpha	1994–xxxx ?	Prairie View A&M University	Prairie View, Texas	Inactive	
Zeta Alpha Beta	1997–xxxx ?	Illinois Wesleyan University	Bloomington, Illinois	Active	
Zeta Alpha Gamma	1999–20xx ?	Butler County Community College	Butler Township, Pennsylvania	Inactive	
Zeta Alpha Delta	2000–20xx ?	University of Indianapolis	Indianapolis, Indiana	Inactive	
Zeta Alpha Epsilon	2000–20xx ?	University of West Georgia	Carrollton, Georgia	Inactive	
**Zeta Alpha Zeta**	2000	Nicholls State University	Thibodaux, Louisiana	Active	
**Zeta Alpha Eta**	2001	Alma College	Alma, Michigan	Active	
Zeta Alpha Theta	2003–20xx ?	Ferrum College	Ferrum, Virginia	Inactive	
**Zeta Alpha Iota**	2003	Muskingum University	New Concord, Ohio	Active	
**Zeta Alpha Kappa**	2003	Millsaps College	Jackson, Mississippi	Active	
**Zeta Alpha Lambda**	2004	Marietta College	Marietta, Ohio	Active	
**Zeta Alpha Mu**	2004	Saint Peter's University	Jersey City, New Jersey	Active	
Zeta Alpha Nu	2004–20xx ?	Texas Christian University	Fort Worth, Texas	Inactive	
**Zeta Alpha Omicron**	2004	Lyon College	Batesville, Arkansas	Active	
Zeta Alpha Xi	2005–20xx ?	Spelman College	Atlanta, Georgia	Inactive	
Zeta Alpha Pi	2005–20xx ?	Huntington University	Huntington, Indiana	Inactive	
Zeta Alpha Rho	2005–20xx ?	State University of New York at Potsdam	Potsdam, New York	Inactive	
Zeta Alpha Sigma	2005–20xx ?	University of Mount Union	Alliance, Ohio	Inactive	
**Zeta Alpha Tau**	2005	Christopher Newport University	Newport News, Virginia	Active	
**Zeta Alpha Upsilon**	2005	Piedmont University	Demorest, Georgia	Active	
Zeta Alpha Phi	2006–20xx ?	Savannah State University	Savannah, Georgia	Inactive	
Zeta Alpha Chi	2006–20xx ?	Wagner College	Staten Island, New York	Inactive	
**Zeta Alpha Psi**	2007	Carthage College	Kenosha, Wisconsin	Active	
Zeta Alpha Omega	2007–20xx ?	Wingate University	Wingate, North Carolina	Inactive	
Eta Alpha	2007–20xx ?	Laredo College	Laredo, Texas	Inactive	
Eta Beta	2007–20xx ?	Tougaloo College	Jackson, Mississippi	Inactive	
**Eta Gamma**	2007	Lycoming College	Williamsport, Pennsylvania	Active	
**Eta Delta**	2008	California State University, Fullerton	Fullerton, California	Active	
**Eta Epsilon**	2008	Midwestern State University	Wichita Falls, Texas	Active	
**Eta Zeta**	2008	Bluefield University	Bluefield, Virginia	Active	
Eta Eta	2008–20xx ?	Georgian Court University	Lakewood Township, New Jersey	Inactive	
Eta Theta	2009–20xx ?	Valdosta State University	Valdosta, Georgia	Inactive	
**Eta Iota**	2009	South Carolina State University	Orangeburg, South Carolina	Active	
Eta Lambda	2009–20xx ?	West Virginia University	Morgantown, West Virginia	Inactive	
Eta Mu	2009–20xx ?	Virginia Commonwealth University	Richmond, Virginia	Inactive	
Eta Kappa	2010–20xx ?	Brunswick Community College	Bolivia, North Carolina	Inactive	
**Eta Nu**	2010	Southeastern Louisiana University	Hammond, Louisiana	Active	
**Eta Xi**	2010	The College of New Jersey	Ewing, New Jersey	Active	
**Eta Omicron**	2010	Del Mar College	Corpus Christi, Texas	Active	
Eta Pi	201x ?	Indiana University of Pennsylvania	Indiana County, Pennsylvania	Inactive	
Eta Rho	2010–20xx ?	New Jersey City University	Jersey City, New Jersey	Inactive	
**Eta Sigma**	2010	The Art Institute of Pittsburgh Online Division	Pittsburgh, Pennsylvania	Active	
**Eta Tau**	2010	Nossi College of Art & Design	Nashville, Tennessee	Active	
**Eta Upsilon**	2011	University of Texas Permian Basin	Odessa, Texas	Active	
**Eta Phi**	2011	Belmont University	Nashville, Tennessee	Active	
Eta Chi	2011–20xx ?	University of Dayton	Dayton, Ohio	Inactive	
**Eta Psi**	2011	Capital University	Bexley, Ohio	Active	
**Eta Omega**	2011	University of Lynchburg	Lynchburg, Virginia	Active	
**Theta Alpha**	2011	Meredith College	Raleigh, North Carolina	Active	
**Theta Beta**	2011	Reinhardt University	Waleska, Georgia	Active	
Theta Gamma	2011–20xx ?	Bradley University	Peoria, Illinois	Inactive	
**Theta Delta**	201x ?	Barry University	Miami Shores, Florida	Active	
Theta Epsilon	201x ?–20xx ?	The Art Institute of Virginia Beach	Virginia Beach, Virginia	Inactive	
**Theta Zeta**	201x ?	North Carolina Central University	Durham, North Carolina	Active	
**Theta Eta**	201x ?	Truman State University	Kirksville, Missouri	Active	
Theta Theta	201x ?–20xx ?	Southwest University of Visual Arts	Tucson, Arizona	Inactive	
Theta Iota	201x ?–20xx ?	University of Arkansas at Pine Bluff	Pine Bluff, Arkansas	Inactive	
Theta Kappa	201x ?–20xx ?	Emory and Henry College	Emory, Virginia	Inactive	
Theta Lambda	201x ?–20xx ?	Westfield State University	Westfield, Massachusetts	Inactive	
Theta Mu	201x ?–20xx ?	Framingham State University	Framingham, Massachusetts	Inactive	
Theta Nu	High Point University	High Point, North Carolina	Active		
**Theta Xi**	2013	Denison University	Granville, Ohio	Active	
Theta Omicron	201x ?–20xx ?	Lourdes University	ylvania, Ohio	Inactive	
**Theta Pi**	201x ?	Dallas Baptist University	Dallas, Texas	Active	
Theta Rho	201x ?–2018	The Art Institute of Washington	Arlington, Virginia	Inactive	(Note: The institute closed in 2018.)
**Theta Sigma**	201x ?	Henderson State University	Arkadelphia, Arkansas	Active	
**Theta Tau**	201x ?	Tennessee State University	Nashville, Tennessee	Active	
Theta Upsilon	201x ?–20xx ?	University of North Carolina Wilmington	Wilmington, North Carolina	Inactive	
**Theta Phi**	201x ?	Radford University	Radford, Virginia	Active	
**Theta Chi**	201x ?	University of Redlands	Redlands, California	Active	
Theta Psi	201x ?–20xx ?	Cazenovia College	Cazenovia, New York	Inactive	
Theta Omega	201x ?–20xx ?	Franklin College	Franklin, Indiana	Inactive	
**Iota Alpha**	201x ?	Jacksonville State University	Jacksonville, Alabama	Active	
**Iota Beta**	201x ?	Austin Peay State University	Clarksville, Tennessee	Active	
Iota Gamma	201x ?–20xx ?	University of Missouri	Columbia, Missouri	Inactive	
**Iota Delta**	201x ?	Young Harris College	Young Harris, Georgia	Active	
**Iota Epsilon**	201x ?	Caldwell University	Caldwell, New Jersey	Active	
**Iota Zeta**	201x ?	Chowan University	Murfreesboro, North Carolina	Active	
Iota Eta	201x ?–20xx ?	Pepperdine University	Malibu, California	Inactive	
**Iota Theta**	201x ?	Emmanuel College	Boston, Massachusetts	Active	
Iota Iota	201x ?–20xx ?	New River Community College	Dublin, Virginia	Inactive	
**Iota Kappa**	201x ?	Culver–Stockton College	Canton, Missouri	Active	
**Iota Lambda**	201x ?	Athens State University	Athens, Alabama	Active	
**Iota Mu**	2015	Virginia Tech	Blacksburg, Virginia	Active	
**Iota Nu**	c. 2016	Hartwick College	Oneonta, New York	Active	
**Iota Xi**	c. 2016	Otterbein University	Westerville, Ohio	Active	
**Iota Omicron**	c. 2016	West Chester University	West Chester, Pennsylvania	Active	
**Iota Pi**	c. 2016	Campbellsville University	Campbellsville, Kentucky	Active	
**Iota Rho**	c. 2016	Lebanon Valley College	Annville, Pennsylvania	Active	
**Iota Sigma**	c. 2016	Pittsburg State University	Pittsburg, Kansas	Active	
**Iota Tau**	c. 2017	Notre Dame of Maryland University	Baltimore, Maryland	Active	
**Iota Upsilon**	c. 2017	DePauw University	Greencastle, Indiana	Active	
**Iota Phi**	c. 2017	University of Central Florida	Orlando, Florida	Active	
**Iota Chi**	c. 2017	California State University, East Bay	Hayward, California	Active	
**Iota Psi**	c. 2017	Jackson State University	Jackson, Mississippi	Active	
**Iota Omega**	c. 2017	The Art Institute of San Antonio	San Antonio, Texas	Active	
**Kappa Alpha**	2018	University of West Florida	Pensacola, Florida	Active	
**Kappa Beta**	c. 2018	Roanoke College	Salem, Virginia	Active	
**Kappa Gamma**	c. 2018	Adrian College	Adrian, Michigan	Active	
**Kappa Delta**	c. 2018	Thomas More University	Crestview Hills, Kentucky	Active	
**Kappa Epsilon**	c. 2018	McKendree University	Lebanon, Illinois	Active	
Kappa Zeta	c. 2018–20xx ?	Hastings College	Hastings, Nebraska	Inactive	
**Kappa Eta**	c. 2018	Middlesex College	Edison, New Jersey	Active	
**Kappa Theta**	c. 2018	Sweet Briar College	Sweet Briar, Virginia	Active	
**Kappa Iota**	c. 2018	Northern Kentucky University	Highland Heights, Kentucky	Active	
Kappa Kappa		not assigned		Inactive	
**Kappa Lambda**	c. 2018	Marist College	Poughkeepsie, New York	Active	
**Kappa Mu**	c. 2018	St. Joseph's College	New York	Active	
**Kappa Nu**	c. 2018	PennWest California	California, Pennsylvania	Active	
Kappa Xi	c. 2018–20xx ?	Franklin College	Franklin, Indiana	Inactive	
**Kappa Omicron**	c. 2018	George Washington University	Washington, D.C.	Active	
**Kappa Rho**	c. 2018	Rhodes College	Memphis, Tennessee	Active	
**Kappa Sigma**	20xx ?	Piedmont Technical College	Greenwood, South Carolina	Active	
Kappa Tau	20xx ?–202x ?	Illinois Wesleyan University	Bloomington, Illinois	Inactive	
**Kappa Upsilon**	20xx ?	Cumberland University	Lebanon, Tennessee	Active	
**Kappa Phi**	20xx ?	Fairleigh Dickinson University	Madison, New Jersey	Active	
**Kappa Chi**	2022	Creighton University	Omaha, Nebraska	Active	
Kappa Psi		not assigned		Inactive	
**Kappa Omega**	2022 ?	Tuskegee University	Tuskegee, Alabama	Active	
**Lambda Alpha**	2022 ?	Metropolitan State University	Saint Paul, Minnesota	Active	
**Lambda Beta**	2022 ?	St. Ambrose University	Davenport, Iowa	Active	
**Lambda Delta**	2022 ?	University of South Alabama	Mobile, Alabama	Active	
**Lambda Rho**	2025	Ohio University	Athens, Ohio	Active	
