= List of Delta Epsilon Sigma chapters =

Delta Epsilon Sigma is an American scholastic honor society that was established for students of Catholic universities and colleges. It was established at Loras College in Dubuque, Iowa on April 13, 1939. The chapters of Delta Epsilon Sigma are named for letters of the Greek alphabet, in charter date order. In the following list, its active chapters are indicated in bold and inactive chapters and institutions are in italics.

Chapter	Charter date and range	Institution	Location	Status	Ref.
**Alpha**	1940	Loras College	Dubuque, Iowa	Active	
**Beta**	1940	Saint Mary's University of Minnesota	Winona, Minnesota	Active	
**Gamma**	1940	Carroll College	Helena, Montana	Active	
Delta	1940	Fontbonne University	Clayton, Missouri	Inactive	
**Epsilon**	1940	St. Joseph's College	Brooklyn, New York	Active	
**Zeta**	1940	Mount St. Mary's University	Emmitsburg, Maryland	Active	
**Eta**	1940	University of St. Francis	Joliet, Illinois	Active	
Theta	1940	Providence College	Providence, Rhode Island	Inactive	
**Iota**	1940	Regis College	Weston, Massachusetts	Active	
Kappa	1940	Emmanuel College	Boston, Massachusetts	Inactive	
Lambda	1940	University of Dayton	Dayton, Ohio	Inactive	
Mu	1940	Saint John's University	Collegeville Township, Minnesota	Inactive	
Nu	1940	Immaculate Heart College	Los Angeles, California	Inactive	(Note: The college closed in 1981.)
Xi	1940	St. Ambrose University	Davenport, Iowa	Inactive	
**Omicron**	1940	University of Portland	Portland, Oregon	Active	
Pi	1940	Loyola University New Orleans	New Orleans, Louisiana	Inactive	
Rho	1940	Clarke College	Dubuque, Iowa	Inactive	
Sigma	1940	Saint Mary-of-the-Woods College	Saint Mary-of-the-Woods, Indiana	Inactive	
**Tau**	1940	Saint Anselm College	Goffstown, New Hampshire	Active	
Upsilon	1940	College of St. Scholastica	Duluth, Minnesota	Inactive	
Phi	1940	Saint Vincent College	Latrobe, Pennsylvania	Inactive	
**Chi**	1940	Saint Francis University	Loretto, Pennsylvania	Active	
**Psi**	1940	Maryville University	Town and Country, Missouri	Active	
**Omega**	1940	College of St. Benedict	Collegeville, Minnesota	Active	
Alpha Alpha	1940	Loyola University Chicago	Chicago, Illinois	Inactive	
Alpha Beta	1940	Siena Heights University	Adrian, Michigan	Inactive	
**Alpha Gamma**	1940	St. Norbert College	De Pere, Wisconsin	Active	
**Alpha Delta**	1940	Notre Dame of Maryland University	Baltimore, Maryland	Active	
**Alpha Epsilon**	1940	Immaculata University	East Whiteland Township, Pennsylvania	Active	
**Alpha Zeta**	April 1940	Niagara University	Niagara University, New York	Active	
Alpha Eta	1940	St. Mary's University, Texas	San Antonio, Texas	Inactive	
Alpha Theta	1941	DePaul University	Chicago, Illinois	Inactive	
Alpha Iota	1941	College of the Holy Cross	Worcester, Massachusetts	Inactive	
**Alpha Kappa**	1942	Elms College	Chicopee, Massachusetts	Active	
**Alpha Lambda**	1942	University of Saint Mary	Leavenworth, Kansas	Active	
**Alpha Mu**	1942	Seton Hall University	South Orange, New Jersey	Active	
**Alpha Nu**	1942	Saint Michael's College	Colchester, Vermont	Active	
Alpha Xi	1942	Mercyhurst University	Erie, Pennsylvania	Inactive	
**Alpha Omicron**	1942	Rosemont College	Rosemont, Pennsylvania	Active	
Alpha Pi	1942	Rockhurst University	Kansas City, Missouri	Inactive	
**Alpha Rho**	1942	Mount Mary University	Milwaukee, Wisconsin	Active	
**Alpha Sigma**	1942	University of St. Thomas	Saint Paul and Minneapolis, Minnesota	Active	
**Alpha Tau**	1942	University of Mount Saint Vincent	Riverdale, Bronx, New York City, New York	Active	
**Alpha Upsilon**	1942	Chestnut Hill College	Philadelphia, Pennsylvania	Active	
Alpha Phi	1942	Academy of Our Lady of Good Counsel	White Plains, New York	Inactive	
**Alpha Chi**	1942	College of Saint Rose	Albany, New York	Active	
**Alpha Psi**	1942	Carlow University	Pittsburgh, Pennsylvania	Active	(Note: Chapter formed at Mount Mercy College, now called Carlow University.)
Alpha Omega		University of Saint Francis	Fort Wayne, Indiana	Inactive	
Beta Alpha	1942			Inactive	
**Beta Beta**	1942	Misericordia University	Dallas, Pennsylvania	Active	
Beta Gamma	1943	Barat College	Lake Forest, Illinois	Inactive	(Note: The college closed in 2005.)
**Beta Delta**	1944	Caldwell University	Caldwell, New Jersey	Active	
**Beta Epsilon**	1944	Marywood University	Scranton, Pennsylvania	Active	
**Beta Zeta**	1945	Barry University	Miami Shores, Florida	Active	
**Beta Eta**	1945	Marian University	Indianapolis, Indiana	Active	
**Beta Theta**	1946	Avila University	Kansas City, Missouri	Active	(Note: Chapter formed at the College of St. Teresa, now called Avila University.)
Beta Iota	1946	St. Mary's Dominican College	New Orleans, Louisiana	Inactive	(Note: The college closed in 1984.)
Beta Kappa				Inactive	
Beta Lambda	1948	Rivier University	Nashua, New Hampshire	Inactive	
Beta Mu	1948	College of the Sacred Heart	Grand Coteau, Louisiana	Inactive	(Note: The college closed in 1956.)
**Beta Nu**	1948	Cardinal Stritch University	Milwaukee, Wisconsin	Active	
**Beta Xi**	1948	Mount Saint Mary's University, Los Angeles	Los Angeles, California	Active	
**Beta Omicron**	1948	Saint Joseph's College of Maine	Standish, Maine	Active	
Beta Pi	1949	Alverno College	Milwaukee, Wisconsin	Inactive	
Beta Rho	1949			Inactive	
Beta Sigma	1949	Marycrest College	Davenport, Iowa	Inactive	(Note: The college became Teikyo Marycrest University and, later, Marycrest International University during the 1990s. It closed in 2002.)
Beta Tau	1949	Annhurst College	South Woodstock, Connecticut	Inactive	
Beta Upsilon	1950	Aquinas College	Grand Rapids, Michigan	Inactive	
Beta Phi	1951	Mercy College of Detroit	Detroit, Michigan	Active	
**Beta Chi**	1953	Villanova University	Villanova, Pennsylvania	Active	
**Beta Psi**	1953	Siena College	Loudonville, New York	Active	
**Beta Omega**	1954	University of St. Thomas	Houston, Texas	Active	
Gamma Alpha	1955	Catholic University of America	Washington, D.C.	Inactive	
**Gamma Beta**	1955	Assumption University	Worcester, Massachusetts	Active	
Gamma Gamma	1956	Anna Maria College	Paxton, Massachusetts	Inactive	
**Gamma Delta**	1956	Saint Joseph's College	Rensselaer, Indiana	Active	
Gamma Epsilon	1956	Rosary Hill College	Amherst, New York	Inactive	(Note: Chapter formed at Rosary Hill College, now Daemen University.)
Gamma Zeta	1956	Duchesne Academy of the Sacred Heart	Omaha, Nebraska	Inactive	(Note: The academy's college closed in 1968.)
Gamma Eta	1956	Quincy University	Quincy, Illinois	Inactive	
Gamma Theta	1956	National Chapter-at-Large		Inactive	
**Gamma Iota**	1959	Belmont Abbey College	Belmont, North Carolina	Active	
**Gamma Kappa**	1959	St. Bonaventure University	St. Bonaventure, New York	Active	
Gamma Lambda	1959	Southern Benedictine College	Cullman, Alabama	Inactive	(Note: Chapter formed at St. Bernard College, later called Southern Benedictine College. The college closed in 1979.)
**Gamma Mu**	1959	Bellarmine University	Louisville, Kentucky	Active	
Gamma Nu	1959	Marymount Manhattan College	Manhattan, New York	Inactive	
Gamma Xi	1960	Marillac College	St. Louis, Missouri	Inactive	(Note: The college closed in 1974.)
Gamma Omicron	1960	Stonehill College	Easton, Massachusetts	Inactive	
Gamma Pi	1961	Edgewood College	Madison, Wisconsin	Inactive	
Gamma Rho	1962	University of Albuquerque	Albuquerque, New Mexico	Inactive	(Note: The university closed in 1986.)
**Gamma Sigma**	1963	King's College	Wilkes-Barre, Pennsylvania	Active	
Gamma Tau	1965	St. John Fisher University	Pittsford, New York	Inactive	
**Gamma Upsilon**	1965	University of Providence	Great Falls, Montana	Active	(Note: Chapter formed at the University of Great Falls, now the University of Providence.)
**Gamma Phi**	1965	Ohio Dominican University	Columbus, Ohio	Active	(Note: Chapter formed at the College of St. Mary of the Springs, now Ohio Dominican University.)
**Gamma Chi**	1965	Lewis University	Romeoville, Illinois	Active	
Gamma Psi	1965	Pontifical Catholic University of Puerto Rico	Ponce, Puerto Rico	Inactive	
**Gamma Omega**	1968	Molloy University	Rockville Centre, New York	Active	
**Delta Alpha**	1968	Salve Regina University	Newport, Rhode Island	Active	
Delta Beta	1968	San Diego College	San Diego, California	Inactive	(Note: In 1972, the all-female college merged San Diego University, an all-male Catholic university, to form the University of San Diego.)
**Delta Gamma**	1970	Sacred Heart University	Fairfield, Connecticut	Active	
**Delta Delta**	1971	DeSales University	Center Valley, Pennsylvania	Active	(Note: Chapter formed at Allentown College of Saint Francis de Sales, now DeSales University.)
**Delta Epsilon**	1971	Iona University	New Rochelle, New York	Active	
**Delta Zeta**	1971	Notre Dame de Namur University	Belmont, California	Active	
Delta Eta	1972	University of New England	Biddeford, Maine	Inactive	(Note: Chapter formed at St. Francis College, now the University of New England.)
**Delta Theta**	1976	St. Thomas University	Miami Gardens, Florida	Active	(Note: Chapter formed at Biscayne College, now St. Thomas University.)
**Delta Iota**		Spalding University	Louisville, Kentucky	Active	
**Delta Kappa**		Marymount University	Arlington County, Virginia	Active	
Delta Lambda				Inactive	
Delta Mu				Inactive	
**Delta Nu**		Saint Leo University	St. Leo, Florida	Active	
**Delta Xi**		Cabrini University	Radnor Township, Pennsylvania	Active	
**Delta Pi**		Neumann University	Aston Township, Pennsylvania	Active	
**Delta Rho**		Chaminade University of Honolulu	Honolulu, Hawaii	Inactive	
**Delta Sigma**		St. Charles Borromeo Seminary	Wynnewood, Pennsylvania	Active	
**Delta Tau**		Marian University	Fond du Lac, Wisconsin	Active	
**Delta Upsilon**		Thomas More University	Crestview Hills, Kentucky	Active	
**Delta Phi**		St. Gregory's University	Shawnee, Oklahoma	Active	
**Delta Chi**		Mount Aloysius College	Cresson, Pennsylvania	Active	
**Delta Psi**		College of St. Joseph	Rutland, Vermont	Active	(Note: The college closed in 2019.)
**Delta Omega**		Brescia University	Owensboro, Kentucky	Active	
**Epsilon Alpha**		Aquinas College	Nashville, Tennessee	Active	
**Epsilon Beta**		Briar Cliff University	Sioux City, Iowa	Active	
**Epsilon Gamma**		Alvernia University	Reading, Pennsylvania	Active	
**Epsilon Delta**		Holy Cross College	Notre Dame, Indiana	Active	
Epsilon Zeta		Marymount California University	Rancho Palos Verdes, California	Inactive	(Note: The university closed in August 2022.)
**Epsilon Eta**		Villa Maria College	Buffalo, New York	Active	
