= Eileen S. Naughton =

American consultant and politician

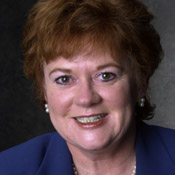

Member of the Rhode Island House of Representatives from the 21st district
- In office January 7, 2003 – January 3, 2017
- Preceded by: Michael S. Pisaturo
- Succeeded by: Camille Vella-Wilkinson

Member of the Rhode Island House of Representatives from the 32nd district
- In office January 5, 1993 – January 7, 2003
- Preceded by: Michael McEntee
- Succeeded by: Melvoid J. Benson

Personal details
- Born: December 29, 1945 (age 80) Providence, RI
- Party: Democratic
- Spouse: William C. Naughton
- Children: 2
- Education: Annhurst College
- Profession: Consultant
- Website: http://www.eileennaughton.com/

Eileen Slattery Naughton, is an American consultant and politician from Warwick, Rhode Island. A Democrat, she served in the Rhode Island House of Representatives, representing the 21st district, which contains the neighborhoods of Conimicut, Hoxsie, and parts of Hillsgrove, including the T.F. Green Airport. She was first elected to the House of Representatives November 3, 1992, and was defeated in the September 13, 2016, primary election in her bid to serve for a 13th term.

== Biography ==
Eileen S. Naughton was born in Providence, Rhode Island on 29 December 1945. She attended St. Mary Academy - Bay View in the Riverside neighborhood of East Providence, Rhode Island before attending Annhurst College in South Woodstock, Connecticut graduating with a B.A. degree in 1967. She earned a J.D. degree from the Southern New England School of Law. Naughton has been active in her community in various capacities, serving on the Board of Directors for: Warwick Chamber of Commerce, the Warwick Historical Society, the Warwick Arts Foundation, the Gaspee Days Committee, the Conimicut Village Association, the Ocean State Lyric Opera, TechACCESS, and the Ocean State Business Development Corporation. Naughton and her husband William C. Naughton reside in the Conimicut neighborhood of Warwick at the historic Lockwood Brook Farm, where they raise heritage breed livestock and poultry. She has two children, Christine and William, and six grandchildren.

== Politics and public service ==
Naughton was first elected to the House of Representatives 2 November 1992 from District 32, defeating incumbent Michael McEntee in the Democratic primary and Republican Arthur F. Chapman by a margin of 73% to 27% in the general election. Upon downsizing of the House of Representatives from 100 to 75 members in the 2002 election, Naughton ran unopposed and was elected to the 21st District. Naughton was most recently reelected on 2 November 2010 defeating Moderate Party challenger Richard L. Lavallee by a margin of 62.1% to 37.9%, winning in all seven of her precincts.

Beginning in January 1993, Naughton served on the Judiciary committee with a four-year tenure on that committee. She had been serving on the Finance Committee since 1997, and was selected to serve as the chairperson of the Subcommittee on Health and the Environment in 2005. Additionally in 2005, she was selected as a Council of State Governments Henry Toll Fellow, and was appointed as chairperson of the Rules Committee.

In addition to being a long-standing member of the Environment & Natural Resources Committee, Naughton has served on a number of committees and commissions focusing on natural resources and environmental issues. Between 1997 and 2004, she was appointed to serve as a Legislative Commissioner on the Atlantic States Marine Fisheries Commission, and as a member of the Rhode Island Coastal Resources Management Council. She served as chairperson of the Legislative Commission on Aquaculture Development (1995–1998), chairperson of the Legislative Commission to Develop and Coordinate a Collaborative Effort to Formulate a Restoration Plan for the North Cape Barge Oil Spill (1999), and chairperson of the Narragansett Bay Trust Study Commission (2003–2004).

She also has served on the Rhode Island Commission on Women, the RI Agricultural Lands Preservation Commission and the RI Economic Policy Council.

Naughton's key legislation in her early years in the General Assembly included an overhaul of the laws regarding aquaculture in the coastal waters of the state. She has also engaged in health care policy issues, serving since 2006 as chairperson of a legislative commission to study blood banking of umbilical cord blood in support of adult stem cell research. Since 2008, she has been engaged in national health care policy issues by serving on the Director's Council of Public Representatives for the National Institutes of Health.

During the 2009-10 session of the Rhode Island House of Representatives she serves as the Chairperson of the Rules Committee, Chairperson of the Health and Environment Subcommittee of the Finance Committee, as well as serving on the Environment and Natural Resources, and Labor Committees.

Naughton was defeated in the September 13, 2016 Democratic Party primary election by Camille F. Vella-Wilkinson.

== Selected legislation as enacted ==
- 1998-H8308 An Act Relating to Fish and Wildlife—Aquaculture: This legislation created a biosecurity board to assist in carrying out the provisions of aquaculture laws and regulations dealing with diseases among aquatic organisms, introduced species, and quarantine of aquatic organisms.
- 1998-H8816 An Aquaculture Act: This legislation was designed to develop and promote Rhode Island's aquaculture industry by creating a "one-stop" permitting process and by designating the Coastal Resources Management Council as the lead agency for the regulation of aquaculture and by creating various mechanisms to assist individuals in the establishment and maintenance of aquaculture projects.
- 2004-H8359aaa The Rhode Island Bays, Rivers, and Watersheds Coordination Team: This legislation established the Rhode Island bays, rivers, and watersheds coordination team to provide interagency coordination in the management, restoration, protection, and sustainable economic development of the state's bays, rivers, estuaries, and watersheds.
- 2005-H5182 Student Vision Health Act: This legislation required the department of health to establish a school vision-testing program for children entering publicly funded pre-kindergarten or kindergarten program for the first time.
- 2007-H6095baa Prevention and Suppression of Contagious Diseases: This legislation included prenatal HIV screening as part of routine prenatal care.
- 2007-H6166a The Lindsay Ann Burke Act: This legislation required school districts to implement dating violence procedures, and required school districts to incorporate an age-appropriate dating violence education program for grades 7 through 12 health education curricula.
- 2008-H7962aaa Hospital Infection Disclosure Act: This legislation required hospitals to collect data on hospital-acquired infections and report them to the Department of Health.
- 2009-H5414aaa Prevention and Suppression of Contagious Diseases - HIV/AIDS: This legislation enabled health care policies and regulations to reduce vulnerability to HIV/AIDS transmission, protect persons who are infected with HIV from discrimination, ensure informed consent for testing, and to provide consistent terms and standards.
- 2009-H5798aaa Stroke Prevention Act of 2009: This legislation enabled state policies to decrease emergency response times for stroke victims and provided for greater emphasis on treatment of stroke and other vascular diseases in Rhode Island.
