= Wilson Wallis =

Wilson Wallis may refer to:

- Wilson Dallam Wallis (1886–1970), American anthropologist
- W. Allen Wallis (1912–1998), American economist and statistician
