= Daughters of the Holy Spirit =

Catholic religious institute serving poor & needy

The Daughters of the Holy Spirit (formerly known as the Daughters of the Holy Ghost) or the White Sisters (French: Filles du Saint-Esprit) are a Roman Catholic religious institute of women founded in France in 1706. The religious sisters of this institute are dedicated to the service of the poor and needy. The motherhouse for the congregation is in Saint-Brieuc, Brittany, France. The members of the congregation use the post-nominal initials of D.H.S. or F.S.E.

== History ==
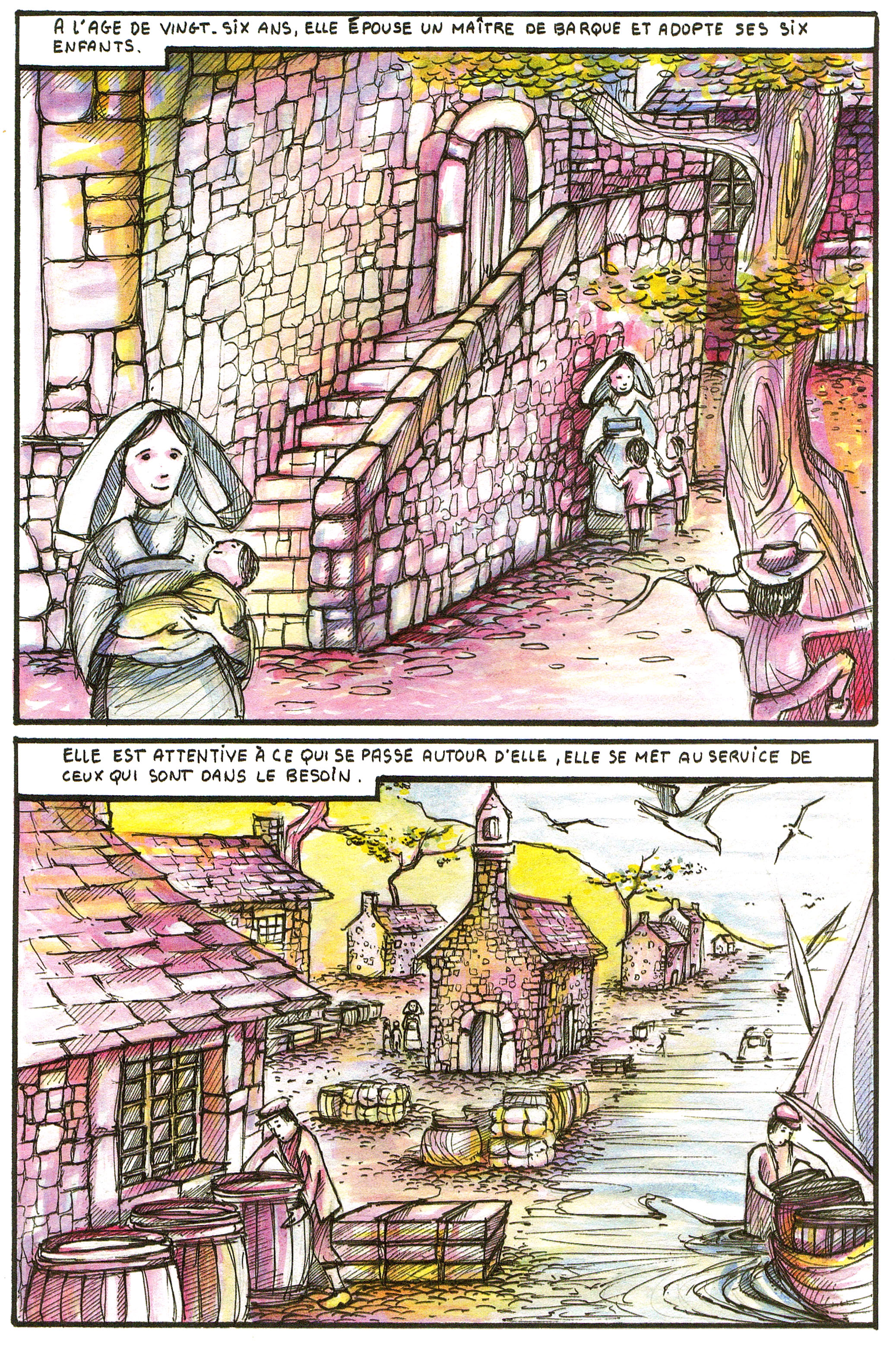
Marie Balavenne and Renée Burel in Plérin in 1706

=== Origins ===
The congregation was founded in the town of Plérin in Brittany on December 8, 1706, by Marie Balavenne (1666-1743), the widow of a former harbormaster, and Renée Burel. Both products of modest homes in the nearby port town of Légué, they felt called to commit themselves to live together and to devote themselves to the service of the poor, the sick and children, primarily through the education of poor girls. They served under the guidance of Jean Leuduger (1649-1722), a local priest, who was head of the missions for Upper Brittany and who supported them in this commitment. He is considered a co-founder of the congregation.

The initial principal object of their service was the education of children; but as other women joined the pair in their work, the growing community soon undertook all kinds of charitable work, serving mainly in small communities scattered throughout the rural parishes of the region. They received official approval as a religious congregation by the Diocese of Saint-Brieuc in 1733.

The members of the congregation became known as the "White Sisters" from the color of their religious habit, which consisted of a white tunic with a starched white veil. For generations, a distinctive part of their habit was the use of side hoops in the manner of 18th-century women's attire, which they discontinued only in the 1950s. Additionally they wore a large, white cape with a black border on the hood, which was the local style of dress in Plérin.

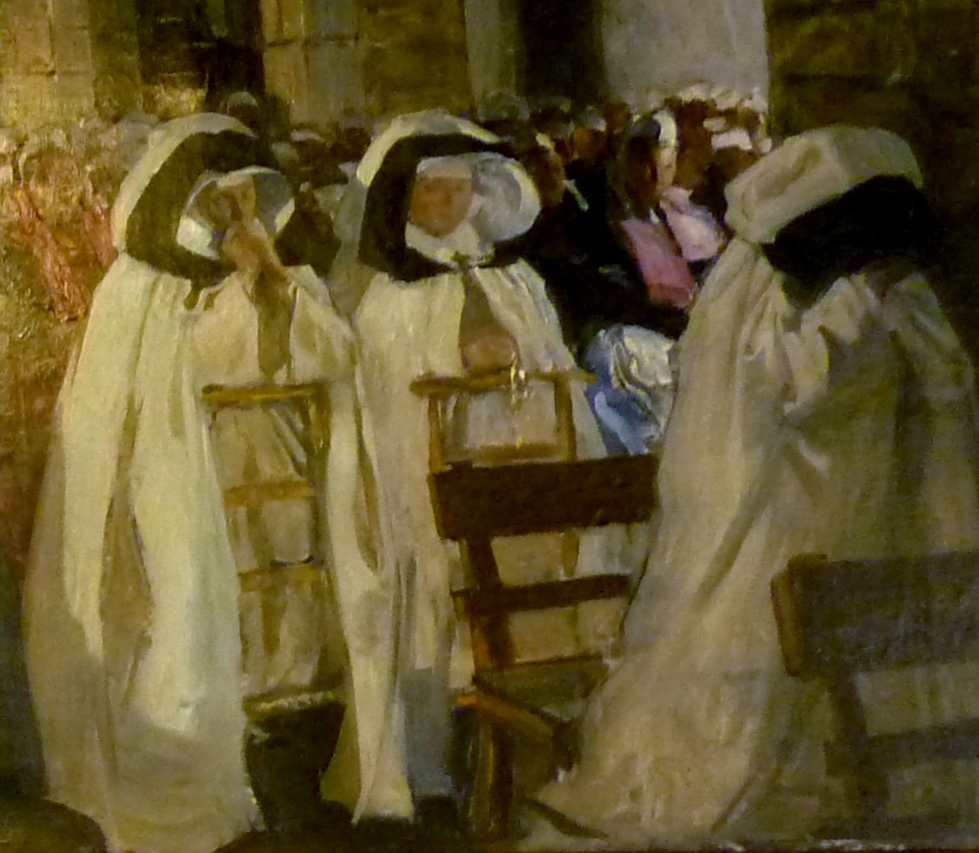
A depiction of some Daughters of the Holy Spirit at prayer in their local church by Lucien Simon (1945)

New opportunities for religious sisters as charitable medical practitioners were created by devout nobles on their own estates. The sisters provided comprehensive care for the sick poor on their patrons' estates, acting not only as nurses, but they took on expanded roles as physicians, surgeons, and apothecaries.

The congregation grew rapidly, and became widespread over north-west France. With 75 members at the time living in 19 communities, it was suppressed during the French Revolution when many of the Daughters left the country to save their lives, but most of the communities were re-established when the practice of the Catholic faith was again allowed in 1801 through the Concordat signed between Napoleon and the Holy See. The congregation doubled in size over the course of the 19th century.

=== Expansion ===
With the start in 1902 of laws limiting the role of the Catholic Church and of religious communities, especially in education, which culminated in the 1905 French law on the Separation of the Churches and the State, again many of the sisters began to leave France, departing for England, Belgium and the United States, while still possessing their motherhouse at Saint-Brieuc, and several other houses in France. The nation and the Holy See settled their disputes in 1921, at which time the congregation was able to take up again fully its service in their native land.

In 1934, the sisters opened a mission in Manchuria, which began a series of missions in the Third World. This was followed by foundations in Africa and South America. They either now serve or have served in Cameroon (1954), Chile (1962), Nigeria (1964-1978), Chad (1974), Peru (1979), Burkina Faso (1994) and Romania (2004).

In the United States, the sisters of the American Province founded what became Annhurst College in South Woodstock, Connecticut, in 1940. This was a women's college for much of its history, which operated until 1980.

As the number of religious sisters declined through the latter half of the 20th century, the Daughters of the Holy Spirit in the United States decided to establish a network of associates, for men and women who wanted to share in a formal way in the spiritual life and work of the sisters. The first associates were admitted there in 1987. By 1996 there had arisen an international network of these men and women which was officially recognized by the congregation. This movement toward further lay involvement in the life and work of the congregation was extended to the formation in 2003 of a secular institute of women living in the world who would consecrate their lives to sharing in the charism of the congregation, while maintaining their careers in the workplace.

=== Mergers ===
In 1994, the Sisters of Our Lady of the Immaculate Conception (French: Congrégation de Notre-Dame de l'Immaculée Conception), founded in the early 19th century and based in Briouze, Normandy, merged with the Daughters of the Holy Spirit. The motherhouse of that congregation, built in 1834, became a retirement community for the older members of the congregation. That house was closed on 6 October 2020 and the five remaining former Sisters of Notre Dame moved to a new facility across the street.

In 2003, the monastery of the Hospitalers of the Holy Spirit in Poligny, Jura, a community of canonesses regular of the Order of the Holy Ghost, a nursing order of both men and women which was founded in Jerusalem in the 9th century and re-established in Europe in 11th century where it soon spread throughout Europe, chose to merge with the Daughters.

== Current status ==
The Daughters of the Holy Spirit currently serve in 13 countries. According to the Papal Yearbook for 2007, at that time they numbered 1,372 sisters in 264 communities around the world.
