= Ruth Sawtell Wallis =

American academic and physical anthropologist

- Born: Ruth Otis Sawtell; March 15, 1895; Springfield, Massachusetts, U.S.
- Died: January 21, 1978 (aged 82); South Woodstock, Connecticut, U.S.
- Scientific career
- Fields: Physical anthropology
- Thesis: Ossification and Growth of Children from One to Eight Years of Age (1929)
- Doctoral advisor: Franz U. Boas

Ruth Sawtell Wallis (15 March 1895 – 21 January 1978) was an American academic and physical anthropologist.

== Biography ==
Ruth Otis Sawtell was born in Springfield, Massachusetts to Joseph Otis Sawtell and Grace Quimby. She graduated from Radcliffe College in 1919 with a bachelor's degree in English. She then attended the school's graduate program in anthropology, traveling to Europe on a science fellowship to do research. She was the first to discover Azilian remains in France, uncovering two at Montardit, Ariège.

Upon her return to the United States, Wallis switched to the anthropology program at Columbia University under Franz Boas. She assisted in one of Boas's most famous studies, an examination of head circumference and changes in head shape among immigrants. She then began studying growth and anthropometrics of young children; her doctoral thesis on that topic "remains a standard study widely quoted today". She was hired by the anthropology department at the University of Iowa in 1930. She married Wilson Dallam Wallis, a professor of anthropology at the University of Minnesota, in 1931, and took an assistant professorship in sociology at Hamline University.

She was later dismissed because "it was unthinkable to have two employed academics in one family during the Depression". On behalf of the Bureau of Home Economics, she undertook the largest ever study of children's growth, which resulted in the standardization of sizing for children's clothes.

During the Second World War, Wallis examined labor statistics for the War Manpower Commission and helped coordinate the Japanese Language and Culture Program for the Army. She began writing mystery novels. She helped create an ethnography of the Micmac in Nova Scotia in the 1950s, and studied other native peoples in both Canada and the United States. After moving to Connecticut with her family, Ruth became a sociology lecturer at Annhurst College in 1956; she eventually became a full professor before retiring in 1974.

== Works ==
- Primitive Hearths in the Pyrenees (1927) (with Ida Treat)
- "Ossification and Growth of Children from One to Eight Years of Age". American Journal of Diseases of Children 37:61-87 (1929)
- Azilian Skeletal Remains from Montardit (Ariege) France (1931)
- Too Many Bones (1943), Dodd Mead; Dell mapback #123 (1946)
- No Bones About It (1944), Dodd Mead; Bantam #72, 1946 (series character Eric Lund)
- Blood from a Stone (1945), Dodd Mead, Bantam #109, 1947
- Cold Bed in the Clay (1947), Dodd Mead (Eric Lund)
- Forget My Fate (1950), Dodd Mead (Eric Lund)
