= Donald Lally =

American politician

Donald J. Lally, Jr.

Member of the Rhode Island House of Representatives from the 33rd district
- In office January 7, 2003 – March 17, 2015
- Preceded by: Peter T. Ginaitt
- Succeeded by: Carol McEntee

Member of the Rhode Island House of Representatives from the 48th district
- In office January 3, 1989 – January 7, 2003
- Preceded by: Gilbert V. Indeglia
- Succeeded by: Robert B. Lowe

Personal details
- Born: February 22, 1955 (age 71) East Providence, RI
- Party: Democratic
- Spouse: Sandra L. Arnold
- Children: Jessica and Connor
- Education: University of Rhode Island; New England School of Law
- Profession: attorney

Donald J. Lally, Jr (born 1955) is an American attorney and former Democratic member of the Rhode Island House of Representatives, representing the 48th District from 1989 to 2002 and the 33rd district from 2003 to 2015 that included parts of Narragansett and South Kingstown, Rhode Island. From 2010 Lally served as House Deputy Majority Whip.

== Biography ==
Lally was born on 22 February 1955 in Rhode Island and he attended East Providence High School in East Providence, graduating in 1973. He earned a Bachelor of Arts degree at the University of Rhode Island in 1977, and attended the New England School of Law, graduating with a Juris Doctor degree in 1998. He is a practicing attorney and member of the Rhode Island and American Bar Associations.

== Politics and public service ==
Donald Lally was first elected as a state representative on 8 November 1988 into the 48th District. Upon downsizing of the House of Representatives from 100 to 75 members in the 2002 election, Lally ran against Republican challenger Harriet E. Powell and was elected by a margin of 58% - 42% to serve in the 33rd District. Running in a four-way race, Lally was re-elected on 4 November 2008. He since 2010 during the tenure of Gordon D. Fox as Speaker of the House he has served as Deputy Majority Whip. During the 2009-2010 legislative session, Lally served on the House Committee on Judiciary, and the House Committee on Municipal Government.
