= Michael Donnelly (veteran) =

United States Air Force fighter pilot

Michael W. Donnelly
- Born: February 3, 1959
- Died: June 30, 2005 (aged 46)
- Military career
- Allegiance: United States
- Branch: United States Air Force
- Rank: Major
- Conflicts: Gulf War
- Awards: Meritorious Service Medal; Air Medal (4)

Michael W. Donnelly (February 3, 1959 – June 30, 2005) was a United States Air Force fighter pilot and activist. Medically retired in 1996 following a diagnosis of Lou Gehrig's disease, he became a leading activist for sufferers of Gulf War syndrome.

== Early life and career ==
A native of Connecticut, Donnelly attended East Catholic High School and graduated from Fairfield University in 1981.

Donnelly joined the United States Air Force and became a fighter pilot, primarily flying the A-10 "Warthog" and F-16. He flew 44 combat missions during Operation Desert Storm as a member of the 10th Tactical Fighter Squadron. After the Gulf War he became Chief of Standardization and Evaluation with the 80th Flying Training Wing and trained NATO pilots.

== Activism ==
Donnelly quickly gained national recognition as a veteran's advocate, including appearing in a feature article in People Magazine. He led a six-year campaign to convince the federal government of the connection between Lou Gehrig's Disease and active service in the Gulf, and provided testimony to the United States Congress regarding this issue.

Donnelly died of his disease in 2005. The Major Michael Donnelly Land Preserve, in his hometown of South Windsor, Connecticut, is named for him. His funeral was attended by H. Ross Perot, whom Donnelly met while advocating for Gulf War veterans. Donnelly also wrote the book Falcon's Cry: A Desert Storm Memoir (1998, Praeger, ISBN 0275964620) with his sister Denise Donnelly.
