= Conimicut, Rhode Island =

Community in Warwick, Rhode Island, U.S.

- Neighborhood
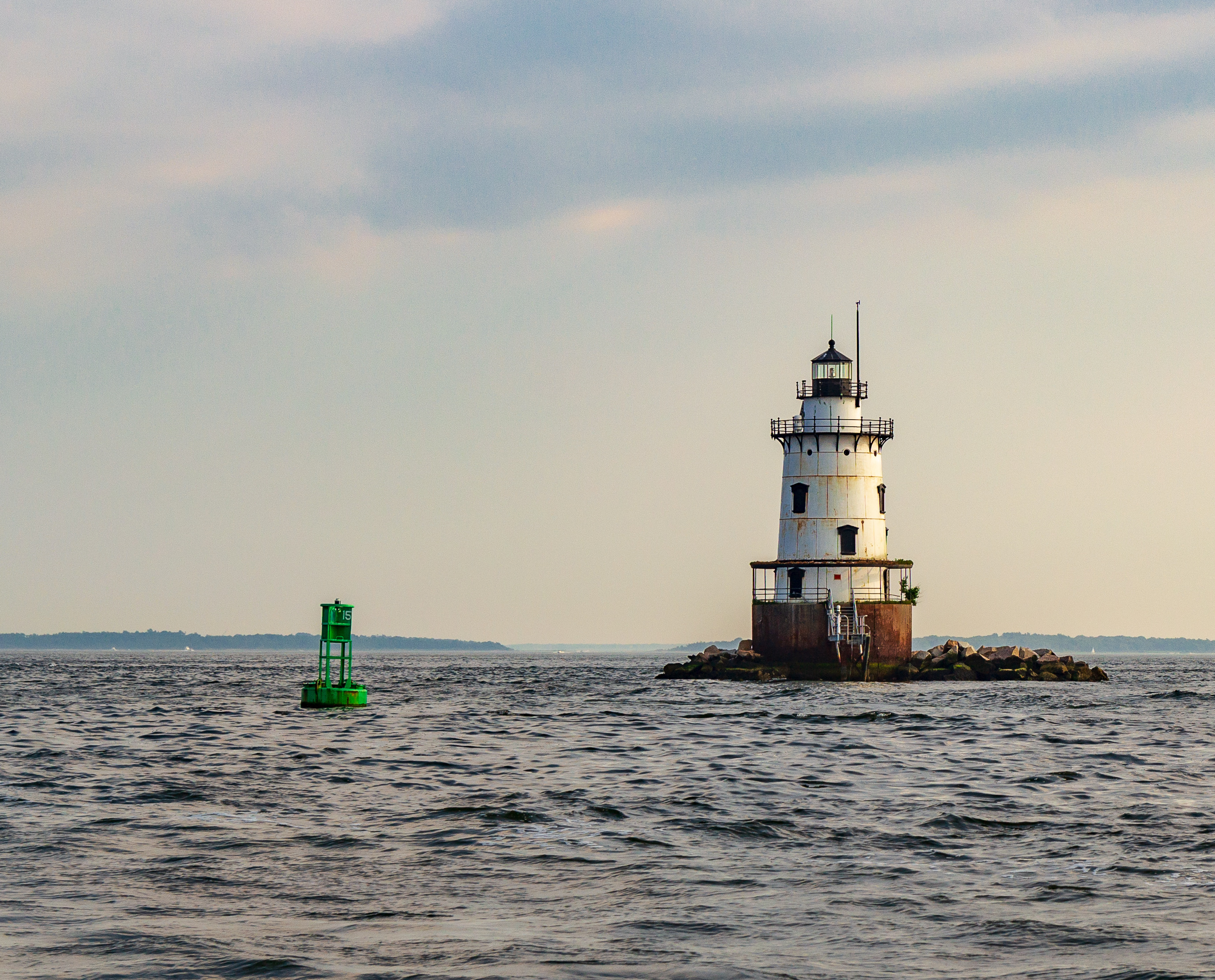
- Conimicut Lighthouse

- Location within Rhode Island Location within the United States
- Coordinates: 41°43′27″N 71°22′58″W
- Country: United States
- State: Rhode Island
- County: Kent
- Elevation: 26 ft (7.9 m)
- Time zone: UTC−5 (Eastern)
  - Summer (DST): UTC−4 (Eastern)
- GNIS feature ID: 1218424

Conimicut (Note: Pronounced /kəˈnɪmɪkət/ kə-NIM-ih-kət) is a neighborhood of Warwick, Rhode Island, United States.

== History ==
Conimicut was settled in 1643 by Samuel Gorton and his followers, who established a settlement south of Conimicut Point at Mill Creek.

Conimicut was named for the granddaughter of Canonicus, Chief of the Narragansett people.

The settlement became an active farming community, and by 1750, was noted for its slave trade and for smuggling.

The Mark Rock Hotel opened in Conimicut in the mid-1800s, and became a popular destination for steamboat passengers nearby Providence.

In 1865, the Warwick Railway was built through Conimicut, establishing easy access to Providence. Conimicut became a summer resort, attracting affluent families who established summer homes there. The railway converted to an electric trolley in 1900, and ceased operation in 1946.

The Conimicut Lighthouse was erected in 1882, and was the last lighthouse in the United States to be electrified. The lighthouse is listed on the National Register of Historic Places.

The Conimicut Casino operated from 1907 to 1914, and "showcased Conimicut as a thriving summer resort."

A volunteer fire department was established in 1911, with a membership that "represented nearly all the permanent resident families in the village".

== Demographics ==
The population in ZIP Code Tabulation Area 02889 was 29,503 with 12,003 housing units; a land area of 8.77 sq. miles; a water area of 0.15 sq. miles; and a population density of 3,365.58 people per sq. mile per the 2000 Census.
