= Carol McEntee =

American politician

Member of the Rhode Island House of Representatives from the 33rd district
- Incumbent
- Assumed office June 16, 2015
- Preceded by: Donald Lally

Member of the South Kingstown Town Council
- In office November 25, 2008 – June 16, 2015

Personal details
- Born: May 7, 1954 (age 72) Warwick, Rhode Island, US
- Party: Democratic
- Spouse: Michael McEntee
- Children: 3
- Education: University of Rhode Island (BS); Suffolk University Law School (JD)

Carol Hagan McEntee (born May 7, 1954) is an American politician and a Democratic member of the Rhode Island House of Representatives, representing District 33 since 2015.

== Early life and education ==
Hagan McEntee was born and raised in Warwick, Rhode Island, US, to Catholic parents. She attended Sacred Heart School in West Warwick for her primary education with her siblings and her parents were "very involved in the church function." Hagan McEntee attended the University of Rhode Island for her undergraduate degree in Oceanography and Suffolk University Law School for her Juris Doctor degree.

== Career ==
Upon concluding her education, McEntee worked as a prosecutor for then-Attorney General James O’Neil before starting her own private law practice with her husband Michael McEntee. In this role, she also worked as the Warwick city prosecutor for several years before she moved her family to Peace Dale. McEntee served as a member of the South Kingstown Town Council from 2008 until June 2015 and as the Special Assistant Attorney General in Rhode Island. In June 2015, Hagan McEntee was elected a member of the Rhode Island House of Representatives, representing District 33. She was officially sworn into office on June 16, 2015, replacing Donald Lally who had resigned earlier in the 2015 session.

During the 2018 legislative session, McEntee sponsored a bill to speed up the divorce process for Rhode Island residents and successfully sponsored legislation that updated Rhode Island's shell fishing laws to be compliant with the National Shellfish Sanitation Program. In 2019, Hagan McEntee introduced legislation to extend the civil statute of limitations for childhood sexual abuse victims. She advocated for the legislation in the name of her sister who was sexually molested repeatedly by their family's parish priest.

== Personal life ==
Hagan McEntee and her husband, former State Representative Michael McEntee, have three children together. Their son, Rory, is president of the South Kingstown Town Council
