= Wilson Dallam Wallis =

American anthropologist (1886–1970)

- University of Oxford Anthropology Diploma class of 1910-11. Wallis is on the left of the back row.
- Born: March 7, 1886; Forest Hill, Maryland, US
- Died: March 15, 1970 (aged 84); South Woodstock, Connecticut, US
- Resting place: Worcester Rural Cemetery, Worcester, Massachusetts
- Education: Dickinson College, B.A., Philosophy and Law (1907); Oxford University, B.Sc., Anthropology (1910); University of Pennsylvania, Ph.D., Philosophy (1915)
- Spouse: Grace Steele Allen (1911–1930); Ruth Otis Sawtell (1931–1970)
- Children: Virginia D. Wallis Bowers; W. Allen Wallis
- Scientific career
- Fields: Anthropology, Ethnology
- Institutions: University of Pennsylvania, University of California, Berkeley, Fresno Junior College, Reed College, University of Minnesota, University of Connecticut, Annhurst College
- Thesis: Individual initiative and social compulsion (1915)
- Notable students: Helen Codere, Elizabeth Colson, Margaret Lantis, Melford Spiro

Wilson Dallam Wallis (March 7, 1886 – March 15, 1970) was an American anthropologist. He is remembered for his studies of "primitive" or nature-based science and religions.

Wallis was born in Forest Hill, Maryland. He completed an undergraduate degree in philosophy and law at Dickinson College, and in 1907 went up to Wadham College, Oxford as a Rhodes Scholar, studying Edward Burnett Tylor. He received his doctorate from the University of Pennsylvania in 1915.

From 1923 to 1954, he taught at the University of Minnesota. After retiring from Minnesota, he taught for a time at Annhurst College. He died in South Woodstock, Connecticut.

== Works ==
- The Malecite Indians of New Brunswick (Ottawa, 1957)
- The Micmac Indians of Eastern Canada (Minneapolis, 1955)
- Messiahs: Christian and Pagan (Boston, 1918)
