= East Catholic High School =

Location
- 115 New State Road; Manchester, Connecticut 06042; United States

Information
- Type: Private, coeducational, Roman Catholic system
- Motto: Quodcumque Dixerit Vobis Facite (Do whatever He tells you)
- Religious affiliation: Roman Catholic
- Established: 1961 (65 years ago)
- Founder: Archdiocese of Hartford, Fr. Shaw (first principal)
- School district: Archdiocese of Hartford
- Superintendent: Val Mara
- CEEB code: 070373
- Chaplain: Rev. Matthew Collins
- Grades: 9–12
- Enrollment: 690 (2011–2012)
- Colors: Blue and white
- Song: "East Catholic Blue and White"
- Athletics conference: Central Connecticut Conference
- Team name: Eagles
- Rivals: Northwest Catholic High School, Manchester High School, Howell Cheney Technical High School
- Accreditation: New England Association of Schools and Colleges
- Publication: E.C.L.A.T
- Newspaper: E.C.H.O.
- Yearbook: AETOS Yearbook
- Tuition: $16,000, $19,000 (international)
- Website: www.echs.com

East Catholic High School is a private, college preparatory high school located in Manchester, Connecticut, United States, under the auspices of the Archdiocese of Hartford. The parochial school was founded in 1961 and is inspired by the charism of the Sisters of Notre Dame de Namur. East Catholic is the only school in the Archdiocese of Hartford that has had the continued presence of its founding order throughout its history.

In the 2011–2012 school year, East had 690 students in grades 9–12, with 47 teachers. Students are representatives of 36 towns and cities in the Greater Hartford area, central Connecticut, and central Massachusetts. In athletics, the school competes in the Central Connecticut Conference.

== Awards and recognition ==
During the 1988–89 school year, East Catholic High School was recognized with the Blue Ribbon School Award of Excellence by the United States Department of Education, the highest award an American school can receive from the United States Department of Education.

East Catholic is accredited by the New England Association of Schools and the State of Connecticut, and is a member of the National Catholic Educational Association, the Connecticut Association of Independent Schools, the Connecticut Association of Schools and the Schools of the Archdiocese of Hartford.

== Leadership ==
Over its history, East Catholic has been led by eight different principals. Starting in 2017, the school administration structure changed to incorporate the position "Head of School" in addition to the traditional principal role. In 2020, the administration changed the “Head of School” and principal roles to “President” with “Deans” of Academics and Students.

- Rev. Charles Shaw, founding Principal (1961–1970) (died in 2011)
- Rev. Robert Saunders, Principal (1970–1981) (died in 1997)
- Rev. William Charbonneau '65, Principal (1981–1986), President (1987–1996) (died in 2010)
- Peg Siegmund, Principal and Chief Administrator (1986–2005)
- Bette Gould, SSJ, Interim Principal (2005–2006) (died in 2014)
- Christian J. Cashman, Principal & Chief Administrator (2006–2010)
- Karen Juliano, Ed.D., Interim Principal (2010–2011)
- Jason S. Hartling, Principal & Chief Administrator (2011–2016)
- Thomas E. Maynard, Interim Principal & Chief Administrator (2016-2017)
- Ryan P. Hinton, Principal (2017 to 2020)
- Thomas E. Maynard, Head of School (2018 to 2019)
- Val Mara, Interim Head of School (2019-2020)
- Sean P. Brennan ‘85, President (2020-)
- Janice Reilly, Dean of Students (2020-)
- Gina Burby, Dean of Academics (2021-)

== Athletics ==
Long-time Athletic Director and Varsity Soccer Coach Tom Malin led the boys' soccer team to his 300th career win against Middletown on October 17, 2007.

In 2011, now-retired baseball coach Jim Penders won his 600th career victory in a state semifinal game against Wamogo High.

The current track and field coach at East Catholic, Bill Baron, was named National Track Coach of the Year in 1988 while coaching at East Hartford High School, and celebrated his 50th year of coaching during the 2015 season.

As of 2019, 83% of the entire student body played a sport on one of the school's 48 athletic teams.

- Baseball — varsity, junior varsity, freshman
- Boys' basketball – V, JV, freshman
- Girls' basketball — V, JV, freshman
- Cheerleading – V
- Boys' cross country — V, JV
- Girls' cross country – V, JV
- Girls' field hockey – V, JV
- Football — V, JV, freshman
- Boys' golf – V, JV
- Girls' golf — V, JV
- Boys' indoor track – V, JV
- Girls' indoor track — V, JV
- Boys' ice hockey — V, JV
- Girls' ice hockey – V
- Boys' lacrosse – V, JV
- Girls' lacrosse — V, JV, freshman
- Boys' outdoor track — V, JV
- Girls' outdoor track – V, JV
- Boys' soccer — V, JV, freshman
- Girls' soccer – V, JV, freshman
- Girls' softball – V, JV
- Boys' swimming & diving – V
- Girls' swimming & diving — V
- Boys' tennis – V
- Girls' tennis — V
- Girls' volleyball – V, JV, freshman
- Wrestling – V, JV

As of 2019, East Catholic has won 61 state championships, including 11 state championships since 2014. The boys' golf program has contributed to more than 20% of the state championships won by East Catholic, winning twelve in total and eleven since 1999.

=== Mascot ===
According to the East Catholic school website, "the students of East Catholic selected the Eagle as the school mascot in our inaugural year during the fall of 1961. This choice was fitting for two reasons:

1. The Eagle is spoken of often in Holy Scripture with reverence and inspiration.
2. The Eagle is a symbol of the United States of America representing freedom, strength, clear vision, and determination."

== Notable alumni ==
- Ralph Brancaccio - artist
- Mary Cadorette - dancer and television actor
- Mike Crispino - sportscaster
- Michael Donnelly - USAF fighter pilot
- Cam Gambolati - trainer of 1985 Kentucky Derby winner Spend a Buck
- Mike McGuirl (born 1998) - basketball player for Hapoel Haifa in the Israeli Basketball Premier League
- Frank Mozzicato - Kansas City Royals pitching prospect
- Jim Penders - head baseball coach, UConn Huskies
