= Magdalena Avietėnaitė =

Lithuanian journalist ( 1892–1984)

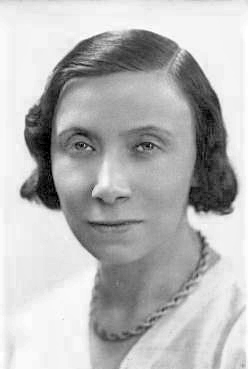
- Born: 22 December 1892; Brazavas, Russian Empire
- Died: 13 September 1984 (aged 91); Putnam, Connecticut, US
- Education: University of Geneva
- Occupations: Journalist, diplomat, public figure

Magdalena Avietėnaitė (22 December 1892 – 13 August 1984) was a Lithuanian journalist, diplomat and a public figure.

== Biography ==
In 1899, Avietėnaitė and her family emigrated to Worcester, Massachusetts. In 1914 she graduated from the University of Geneva in the field of literature and philosophy. From 1914 to 1920, she edited the weekly newspaper Amerikos lietuvis (American Lithuanian).

Avietėnaitė returned to Lithuania in 1920 in response to the call by the president, Antanas Smetona, to the Lithuanian diaspora on 2 November 1919. In Lithuania, she worked at the Ministry of Foreign Affairs until 1940 as a translator, encipherer, secret archive processor and a confidential secretary. From 1924 to 1926, she was the Head of the Lithuanian News Agency ELTA, from 1926 the Head of the Press Bureau, following that, Director of the Press and Information Department. In June 1924, she represented Lithuania at the first International Telegraphic Agencies Conference in Bern, Switzerland, and was the only female among the 22 participants. She belonged to the XXVII Book Lovers society, Lithuanian History and Lithuanian Kanklės societies and was the director of the foreign sector of the Scout Association of Lithuania.

Avietėnaitė organized Lithuanian art exhibitions in cities including Barcelona, Liège, Stockholm, Copenhagen, Gothenburg, Chicago, and Brussels. During the preparation for the International Exposition of Art and Technology in Modern Life, in Paris in 1937, the Lithuanian pavilion, including Avietėnaitė, was assigned to elect the Chair of the Exhibition Committee. During the 1939 New York World's Fair Avietėnaitė was the General Commissioner of the Lithuanian pavilion. On this occasion she organised the Lithuanian day and published a booklet in English depicting the historical path of Lithuania, her artistic life and the participants of the exhibition. Following the end of the exhibition, the Mayor of New York City awarded Avietėnaitė with a gold medal and the honorary citizenship of the City of New York.

On 17 June 1940, after the Soviet occupation, Avietėnaitė and her co-worker Elena Barščiauskaitė risked their lives to remove and transmit Ministry of Foreign Affairs secret files to the Head of the Lithuanian Archives and priest Juozapas Stakauskas. From 1940 to 1944, she taught English at the Vilnius University. She contributed to the safety of the Lithuanian gold reserve located in the United States.

During the German occupation of Lithuania, Avietėnaitė was part of a resistance group. She actively collaborated with the anti-Nazi newspaper Į laisvę (To Freedom). In summer 1944, as the Red Army was approaching Kaunas, Avietėnaitė left Lithuania. Until 1947, she found shelter in a refugee camp in Germany, and worked as a General Secretary at the Lithuanian Red Cross Society. In 1947 she moved to Paris, and in 1949 to the United States.

From 1949 to 1952, Avietėnaitė worked at the library of the University of Detroit Mercy; from 1952 to 1953 she taught sociology at Annhurst College. She was a member of the Supreme Committee for the Liberation of Lithuania and was translating the Committee's documents to English. Prior to retirement Avietėnaitė was a librarian-consultant at the Manhattanville College of the Sacred Heart; in retirement she resided at the nuns' sheltered elder home in Putnam, Connecticut. Until the complete deterioration of her vision, Avietėnaitė handled the monastery's library and engaged in Lithuanian activities that had not been abandoned throughout her life in the United States. As far as her modest financial resources allowed, she supported Lithuanian organisations. Avietėnaitė died in 1984, at the age of 91.

For her merits to Lithuania, Avietėnaitė was awarded both Lithuanian and foreign honors, including Order of the Lithuanian Grand Duke Gediminas (3rd degree) and French Legion of Honour IV Degree.

== Bibliography ==
- Didēji Francijos revoliucija / parašē Madelainē Avietēnaitē. – Worcester [Mass.]: Spauda ir turtu „Amerikos lietuvio“, 1917. – 75 p.: iliustr.
- Istorijos žymiausių Europos tautų dalyvavusių senovēje ir didžioje Pasaulinēje karēje / parašė Madelainē Avietēnaitē. – Worcester, Mass., 1932. – 193 p.
