= Michael McEntee =

American politician

Member of the Rhode Island House of Representatives from the 32nd district
- In office January 3, 1985 – January 5, 1993
- Preceded by: Michael V. D'Ambra
- Succeeded by: Eileen S. Naughton

Personal details
- Born: Warwick, Rhode Island, US
- Party: Democrat
- Spouse: Carol McEntee
- Children: 3
- Education: Boston College Law School (JD)

Michael Joseph McEntee is an American lawyer and politician from South Kingstown, Rhode Island. Originally from Warwick, Rhode Island, McEntee served as a Democrat in the Rhode Island General Assembly, representing the 32nd District in the Rhode Island House of Representatives for eight years.

== Biography ==
McEntee was born in Warwick, Rhode Island. He received his Juris Doctor from Boston College Law School. McEntee was admitted to the Rhode Island Bar Association and Massachusetts Bar Association in 1978. He and his wife, Carol Hagan McEntee, opened a private practice, McEntee & McEntee Law Offices in 1982.

McEntee has three children, one of whom, Rory McEntee, serves as the president of the South Kingstown Town Council.

== Political career ==
McEntee was first elected to the Rhode Island House of Representatives, representing the 32nd District, encompassing Warwick, in 1984. He was reelected in 1986, 1988, and 1990. He was defeated in the 1992 Democratic primary by Eileen Naughton.

McEntee currently serves as the chairman of the South Kingstown Democratic Town Committee.
