= Mike Pisaturo =

American politician

Member of the Rhode Island House of Representatives from the 21st district
- In office January 2, 1997 – January 3, 2003
- Preceded by: Beatrice A. Lanzi
- Succeeded by: Eileen Naughton

Personal details
- Born: April 14, 1963 (age 63)
- Party: Democratic

Mike Pisaturo (born April 14, 1963) is a former American politician, who served in the Rhode Island House of Representatives from 1996 to 2002. He was the first openly gay man to serve in that body.

== Career ==
He first ran for election to the state house in 1994, but was defeated that year. He won election in 1996.

In 1997, he introduced the first bill that attempted to legalize same-sex marriage in the state. Although the bill was defeated, he symbolically resubmitted it each year for the rest of his term. In 1998, he introduced the bill that successfully repealed the state's sodomy laws, as well as a successful bill to grant hospital visitation rights to same-sex couples; in 1999, he introduced a successful bill allowing residents of the state to designate any person, family member or not, as the planner of their funeral.

In 1999, he announced that he was considering a run for the United States Congress in the 2000 Congressional election, but later decided to run for another term in the state house. He won reelection to the state house in 2000.

Pisaturo was defeated in the 2002 election.

Following the end of his term, he was elected as a city councillor in Cranston in 2004.
