= Ralph Brancaccio =

American and European conceptual artist

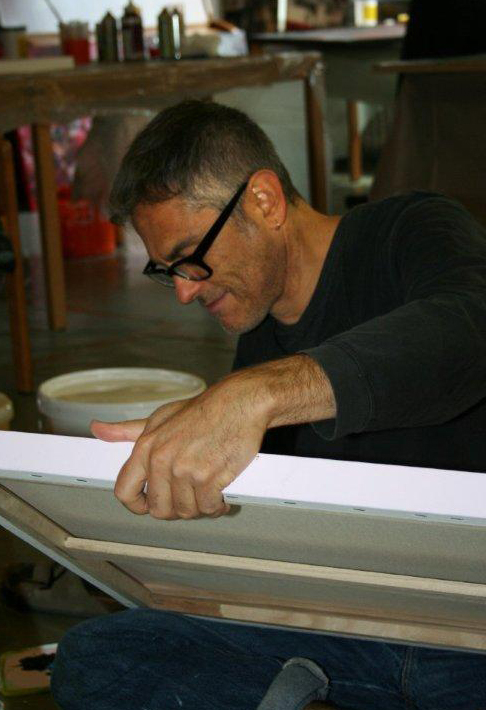
Ralph Brancaccio

Ralph Brancaccio (born 1960 in Brooklyn, New York City) is an American and European conceptual artist whose work is mostly social commentary or politically motivated, whether working in paint, installation/multimedia, or printmaking.

He states, “As a child, I was educated to believe that I was living in a developed society. This I did not see. As my consciousness developed, I began to recognize the dysfunction of a world people call or think civilized."

== Education ==
He graduated from East Catholic High School, Manchester, Connecticut, United States, in 1979 and attended Annhurst College in 1979 and was president of his freshman class. After its closing in 1980 he attended and graduated, class of 1983, from Providence College, Providence, Rhode Island with a B.A. in Humanities.

== Work ==
=== Manhole cover printing ===
The note-worthy print maker Ralph Brancaccio, a conceptual artist from New York, began a body of work known as "A Visual Travel Dairy" in 1990. He has printed in over thirty countries, but he only makes three prints per plate (manhole cover).

[It] was not until his late twenties that he realized art would be his life's work. In the spring of 1990, he tested the idea in New York City on East Forty-fifth Street and Third Avenue. The manhole cover became his printing plate. Sometimes he prints the entire cover, or sometimes he reproduces particular elements from its design. The pivotal act that cemented this decision was a series of five manhole cover prints titled, " Mandela : a man and his Freedom" from Basel, Switzerland.

He signs his prints with the exact street address, city, and country in which the cover was found as well as the date it was printed are recorded. According to David Galloway, the results are documents of a particular culture at a particular time, but they are also and unmistakably "Brancaccio's." For those who have encountered these monoprints, the manhole will never be the same. Here are quite simply artists whose idiom changes the way we see our day-today environment: Dan Flavin's neon tubes, David Hockney's swimming pools and Daniel Buren's stripes have long since exerted such an impact. Brancaccio has stated that, “By putting myself at people’s feet, I bring beauty up to their level which causes them to look down.”

An exhibition in the city museum Musee des Egouts de Paris titled "D'Egouts et des Couleurs" opened in June 1998. Nearly one hundred prints from major cities around the world were shown in tunnels. The City also commissioned a 1999 New Years Card, which was created using a Paris manhole cover on Avenue Rapp.

In 2011 he was commissioned to print manhole covers in Paderborn, Germany for Paderorner Kultursommer.

Brancaccio travels to India to inspire young artists in December 2011. He joined more than seventy painters and sculptors of international repute in a twenty-five-day International Sculpture and Painting Symposium held at the Sri Guru Vidya Peeta Education Institute complex at India's Kanadal village on the outskirts of the city. Six sculptors including Brancaccio, according to The Hindu newspaper are donating their works to the Peeta Education Institute as a gesture and to promote fine arts education amongst youth. Brancaccio is represented by Saatchi Gallery in New York City and his provocative conceptual works challenge social paradigms including faith and conscience. He is also noted for creating works using unorthodox tools such as manhole covers in the street as a printing plate.

Ralph Brancaccio from New York lights up the beauty of the Neviges pedestrian area. Since 1990, manhole covers have been his printing plates in over 30 countries, and what results are colored impressions of the previously painted. Now he is in Neviges and shows his works in the Mariendom. The exhibition with 30 artists starts on Saturday at 4.30pm. If you don't know Neviges yet, you finally have a reason to come. – 13.10 – 25.11.2018.

=== Silent march ===
“Silent March” was created in 1992 as a multidisciplinary arts project to help curtail the spread of HIV. Originally he intended to line up 25,000 pairs of shoes for a "Silent March: at New York's City Hall. New York Foundation for the Arts sponsored the project in 1995. Because of the funding challenges to fully develop the project Brancaccio took to the streets. Site-specific installations were produced using shoes belonging to people living with HIV, AIDS and of those who had lost their life to the disease.

He placed his works in Grand Central Terminal and other public spaces in New York City, and stood with a sign stating “AIDS Makes No Choices, You Do”. The shoes placed before him were tagged with the individual's names, birth date and if appropriate their date of death. Prevention literature provided by the Centers for Disease Control was distributed.

=== The Y Project ===
"The Y Project" opened with “Y Discriminate” a bright pink sculpture in the shape of the letter Y. It was sited in New York City on Sixth Avenue and Ninth Street in 1998 on the Ruth Wittenberg Triangle; the beginning of Christopher Street where in 1969 the Stonewall riots began. The project is sponsored by New York Foundation for the Arts.

“The Y Project" a temporary public installation, uses the letter Y to represent the word why. Y steel sculptures stand ten feet tall and sport an engraved word running vertically down the letters base. (Y Art, Y Think, Y Care, etc.) Brancaccio asks, “Why do we live so comfortably with an imbalance of human equality and irresponsibility?”

"Y AIDS" was placed in Providence, Rhode Island at Washington Plaza through Convergence 11 an international celebration of the arts in June 1998. The City Of Providence, Vincent A. Cianci, Jr., Mayor, and Nancy L. Derrig, Superintendent of the Department of Public Parks and Bob Rizzo, Director of the Office of Cultural Affairs, produced it.

The Cambridge Arts Council and the Puffin Foundation partially funded the project in 2008 for an installation in Cambridge, Massachusetts. Four Sculptures were installed; Y AIDS, Y Discriminate, Y Think and Y Care. Brancaccio worked with the Community Art Center's Teen Media Program creating films around the project. He also gave a presentation at the Broad Institute of MIT and Harvard. "The Y Project" has also been sited in Provincetown, Massachusetts, with the Provincetown Art Association and Museum, in 2009; Whitinsville, Massachusetts, in 2010 and The University of Connecticut, Storrs, Connecticut, in 2011.

=== Lima Lives ===
"Lima Lives!" is a sound and video installation that was funded by Atlanta's Flux Projects 2010. A collaborative effort with artists Ed and Linda Calhoun, the piece celebrates the life and spirit of Lima, a zebra that escaped from the Ringling Brothers and Barnum & Bailey Circus on February 18, 2010 and stopped traffic in Atlanta and later euthanized. The installation combines real 911 tapes with a fictionalized look at Lima's early life as well as roving projection throughout the city.

Wit abounded, sometimes for its own sake, but more often as a vehicle for provoking thought. The video "Lima Lives" – a true-life Atlanta story about a run away circus zebra named Lima and the attendant absurdities of police chasing "Perp 43" (to quote the police dispatcher) – was amusing and cleverly visualized. It also evoked the poignancy of a caged animal's life, particularly the voice-over about Lima trying to "go home."

=== Other work ===
In 2002 Brancaccio participated in a TransCultural Exchange project titled “The Coaster Project; Destination, the World”. Over 99+ artists transcended geographical, political and cultural boundaries to stage 99+ exhibitions throughout the world. Afterwards, all 10,000+ art works were given away in the guise of “coasters” at bars, cafes and restaurants. Brancaccio organized an event at Tokyo Eat at the Paris museum Palais de Tokyo. He also participated in The Tile Project: Destination, the World. He collaborated with artist Leo F. Hobaica, Jr. The piece is titled, "One Earth". Participants were asked to plant French soil in their country and send soil to them from their country. These soil samples were then mixed and used to create tiles.

In 2001 Brancaccio worked with the late Andrea Bronfman who chose a manhole cover print from the south of France from which he created a logo and theme that was used to adorn the celebrations of Charles Bronfman's seventieth birthday in the Israeli Negev Desert and on a Cunard Line yacht the Seabourn Goddess.

Brancaccio partnered in 2001 with ActionAIDS to bring “The Y Project” to Philadelphia. While working towards authorization from the city to place ten Y sculptures, he collaborated with the Samuel S. Fleisher Art Memorial and the Rosenbach Museum & Library. Fourth graders at Greenfield Elementary School were taught manhole cover printing as part of the program "Planet Greenfield: A Neighborhood Mapping Project". He also taught his printing technique to adjudicated youth at ArtScape, a Mural Arts Program, and lectured at Central High School. Simultaneously the United States engaged in war with Iraq and due to a reduction in arts funding "The Y Project" for Philadelphia was put on hold.

A fundraising exhibition was held at the William Way LGBT Community Center March 2003. Auctioned off was his conceptual portrait of Elizabeth Taylor, created with footprints from her shoes. Shoes played a major role in another endeavor, a fund-raising project called "Putting Your Foot Down for AIDS." Following his idea with the manholes, Brancaccio began using the patterned soles of people's shoes as a printing plate. Some of the participants included celebrities such as actors James Earl Jones, Anjelica Huston along with designer Jean Paul Gaultier and director Pedro Almodóvar.

== Selected exhibitions ==
- 2007 – "A Visual Travel Diary" – Floorz 3/4 Jinmao, Shanghai, China
- 2007 – "Manhole Cover" – Reed Whipple Cultural Center Gallery – Las Vegas, NV
- 2003 – "The Name Game" – Parsons School of Design Gallery – Paris, France
- 1998 – "Y Shadow Boxes" – The John L. Stewart Collection, New York, New York

=== Group ===
- 2012 – "Letter of Pleasure" – Gallerie Kunstwestthuringer – Bad Langensalza, Germany
- 2011 – "DMZ Art Festival" – Seokjang-Ri Art Museum – Yeonchen-Gun, Korea
- 2011 – "360 We & Everybody" – Hampden Galleries – University of Massachusetts, Amherst, Massachusetts
- 2009 – "Art Salat" – Seinajoen Taidehallissa, Seinajoki, Finland
- 2009 – "I Know U" – KIC Art Center, Shanghai, China
- 2007 – "Being" – Zhu Qi Shan Art Museum – Shanghai, China
- 2005 – "Dimensions Varied; Site Fixed" – Cambridge Arts Council Gallery, Cambridge, Massachusetts
- 2003 – "Postcards from the Edge" – Gallerie Lelong – New York, New York
- 2003 – "Peintures, verres et sculptures" – Galerie Allair-Aigret – Paris, France
- 1998 – "Reading Between the Lines" – Rotunda Gallery, Brooklyn, New York
- 1993 – "Silent March" – Minneapolis College of Art & Design, Minneapolis, Minnesota
