= Conimicut Light =

- Conimicut Lighthouse
- U.S. National Register of Historic Places
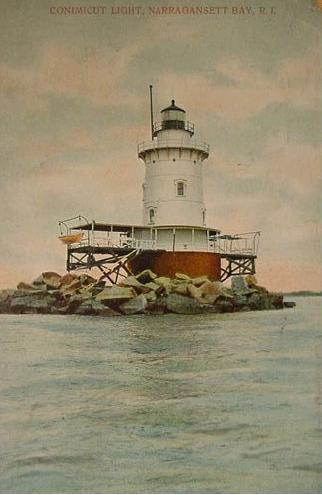
- Conimicut Light in ca. 1905

- Location within Rhode Island Location within the United States
- Location: Warwick, Rhode Island
- Coordinates: 41°43′1″N 71°20′45″W
- Built: 1883
- MPS: Lighthouses of Rhode Island TR
- NRHP reference No.: 88000269
- Added to NRHP: March 30, 1988

Conimicut Light, built in 1883, is a historic sparkplug lighthouse in Warwick, Rhode Island. The lighthouse was listed on the National Register of Historic Places in 1988. The lighthouse is said to be in "relatively good condition."

The lighthouse was built in 1883 using pneumatic caisson engineering. The light replaced an earlier 1868 light. Conimicut Lighthouse was automated in the 1960s and was one of the last acetylene gas powered lights to switch to electricity. The City of Warwick acquired the light in 2004. Initially the city planned to restore the lighthouse, but a federal grant for this purpose failed to come through. Subsequently, the city is considering various plans, including leasing it to a tourism company to be converted into a bed-and-breakfast inn.

This location marks the mouth of the Providence River as it empties into Narragansett Bay.

== See also ==
- National Register of Historic Places listings in Kent County, Rhode Island

== References and links ==
- Lighthouse pics and info
- Conimicut Lighthouse Plans and Maps 1864 - 1938
- America's Atlantic Coast Lighthouses, Kenneth Kochel, 1996
- Northeast Lights: Lighthouses and Lightships, Rhode Island to Cape May, New Jersey, Robert Bachand, 1989.

== Gallery ==
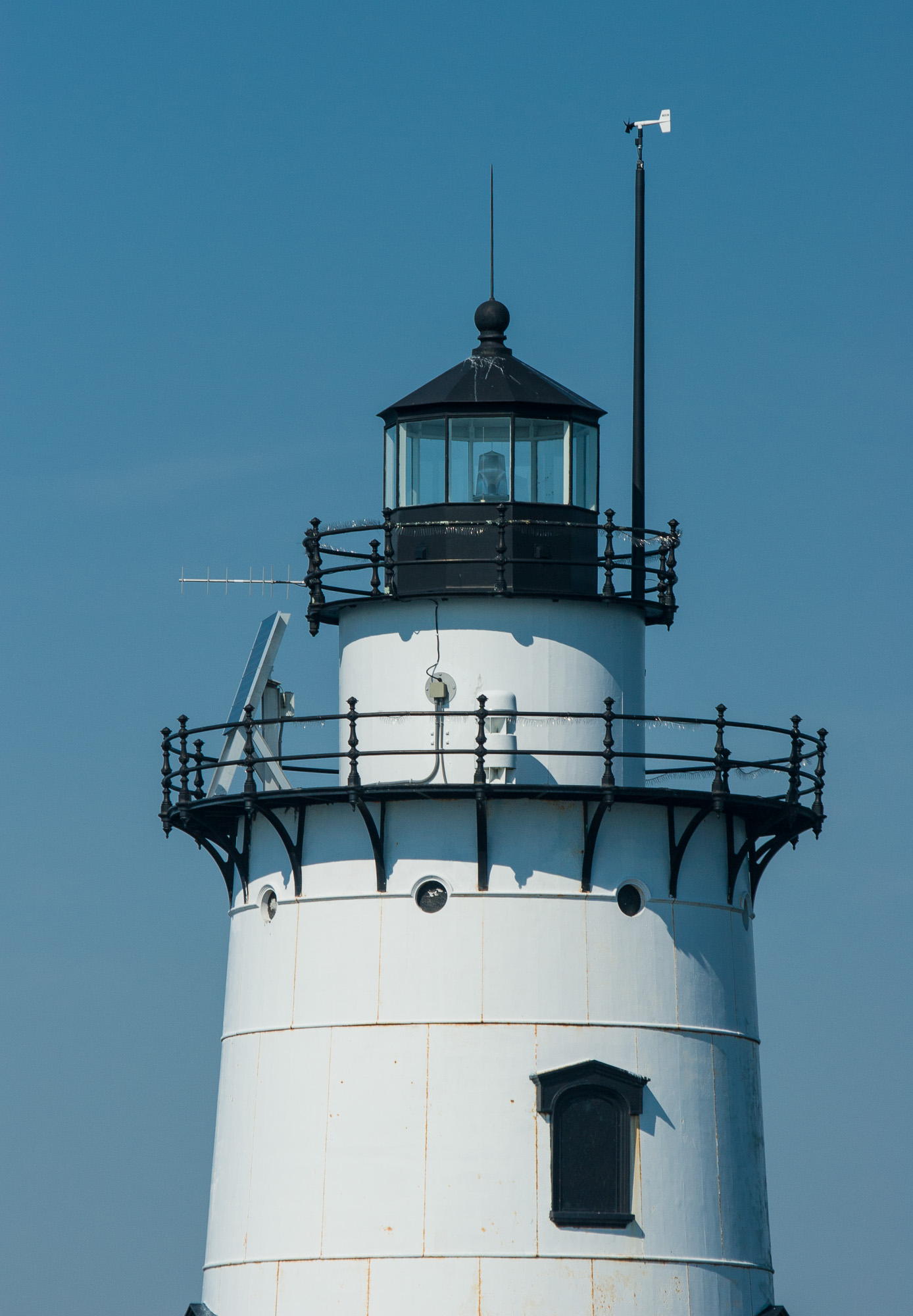

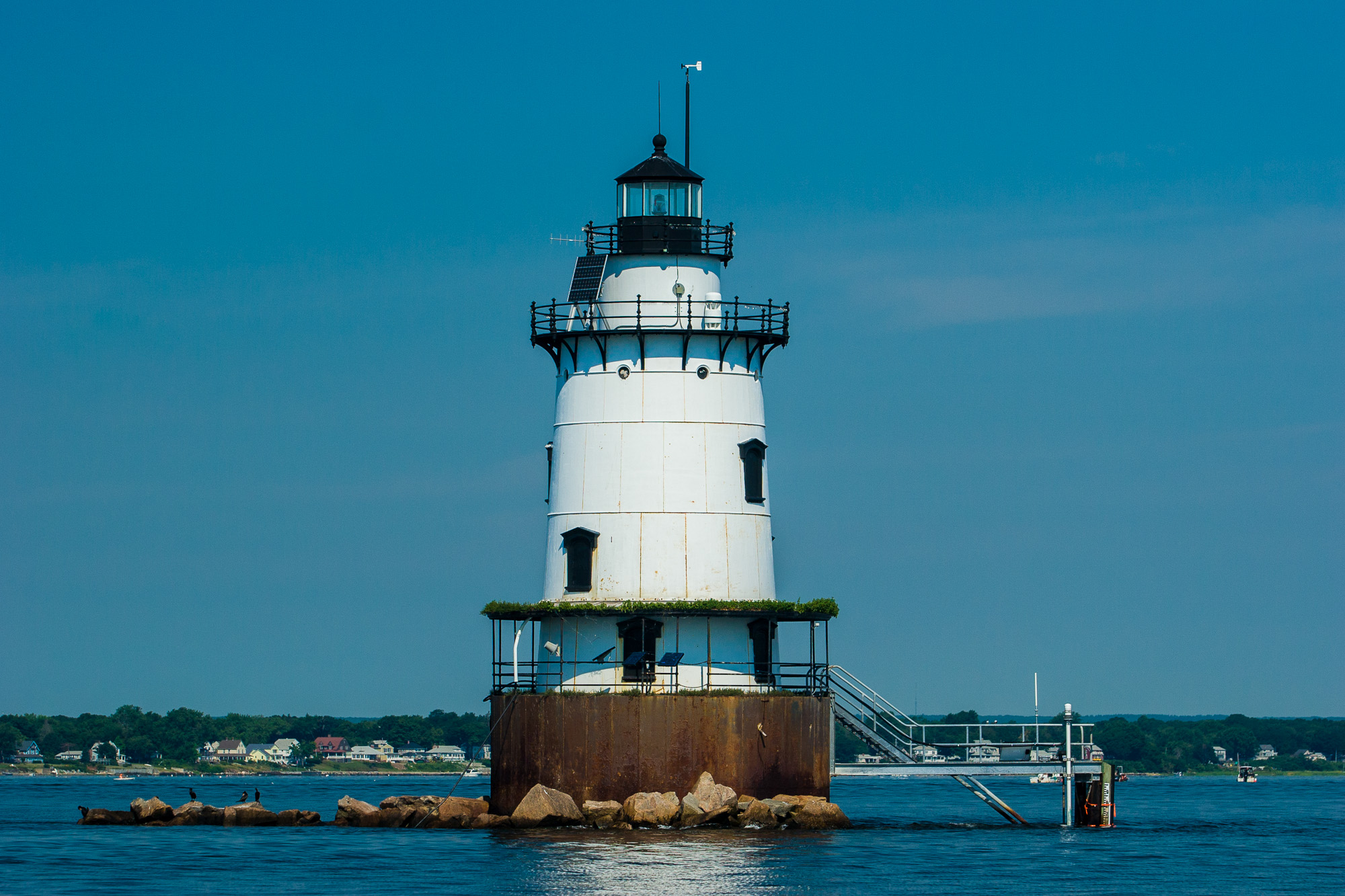

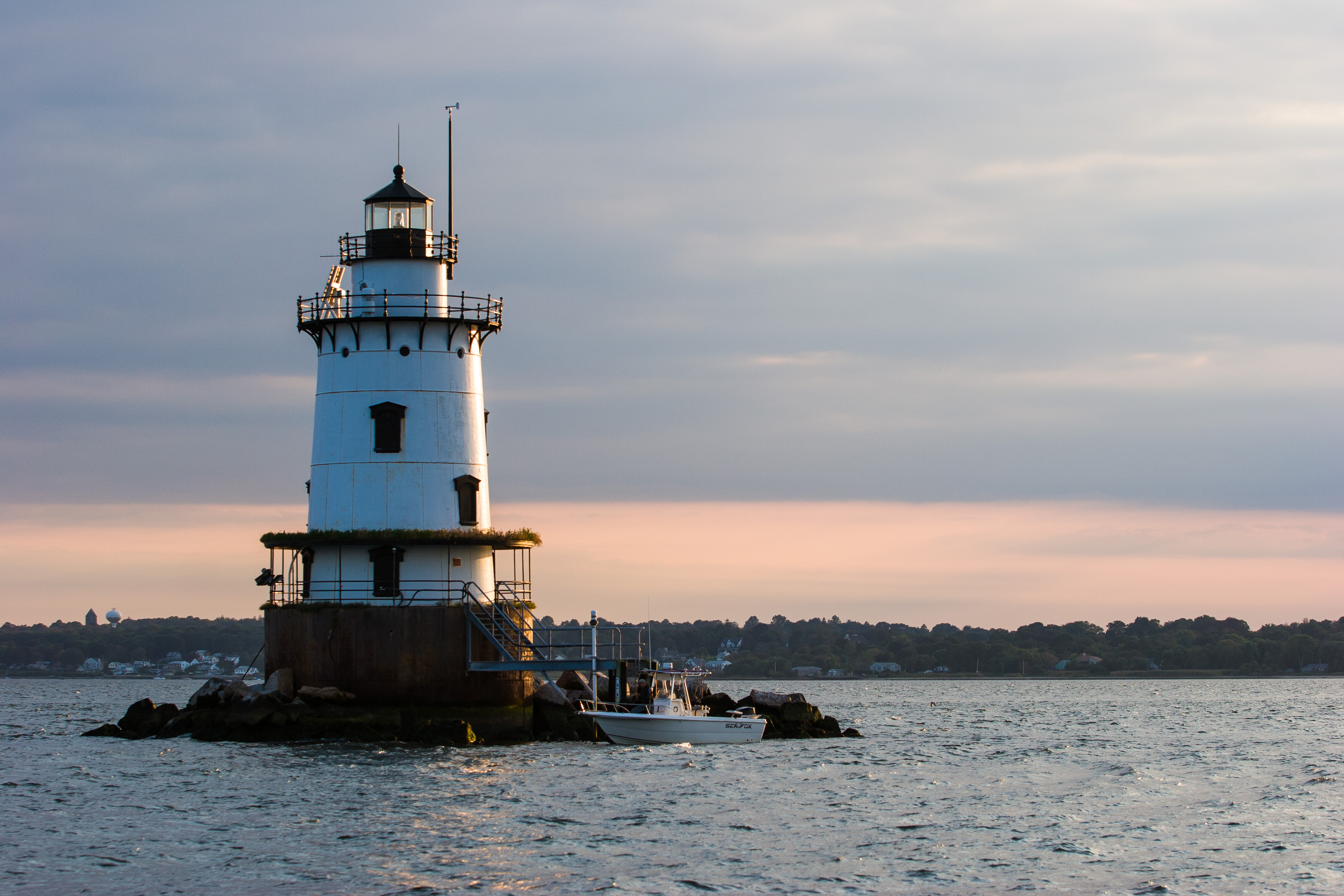
