= Annhurst College =

Catholic college in South Woodstock, Connecticut, US

- Former names: Ker-Anna Junior College
- Motto: Deus Primus Serviatur
- Active: 1941–1980
- Founders: Mother Marie-Louis du Sacré-Coeur, D.H.S.
- Religious affiliation: Catholic
- Location: South Woodstock, Connecticut, United States; 41.928°N 71.957°W

Annhurst College was a private Catholic college in South Woodstock, Connecticut, United States. Operating from 1941 to 1980, the school was founded and administered by the Daughters of the Holy Spirit (at that time known as the Daughters of the Holy Ghost). The college's curriculum was career-focused.

Annhurst was a women's college for most of its history, and began accepting male students for full-time studies in the fall of 1972.

== History ==
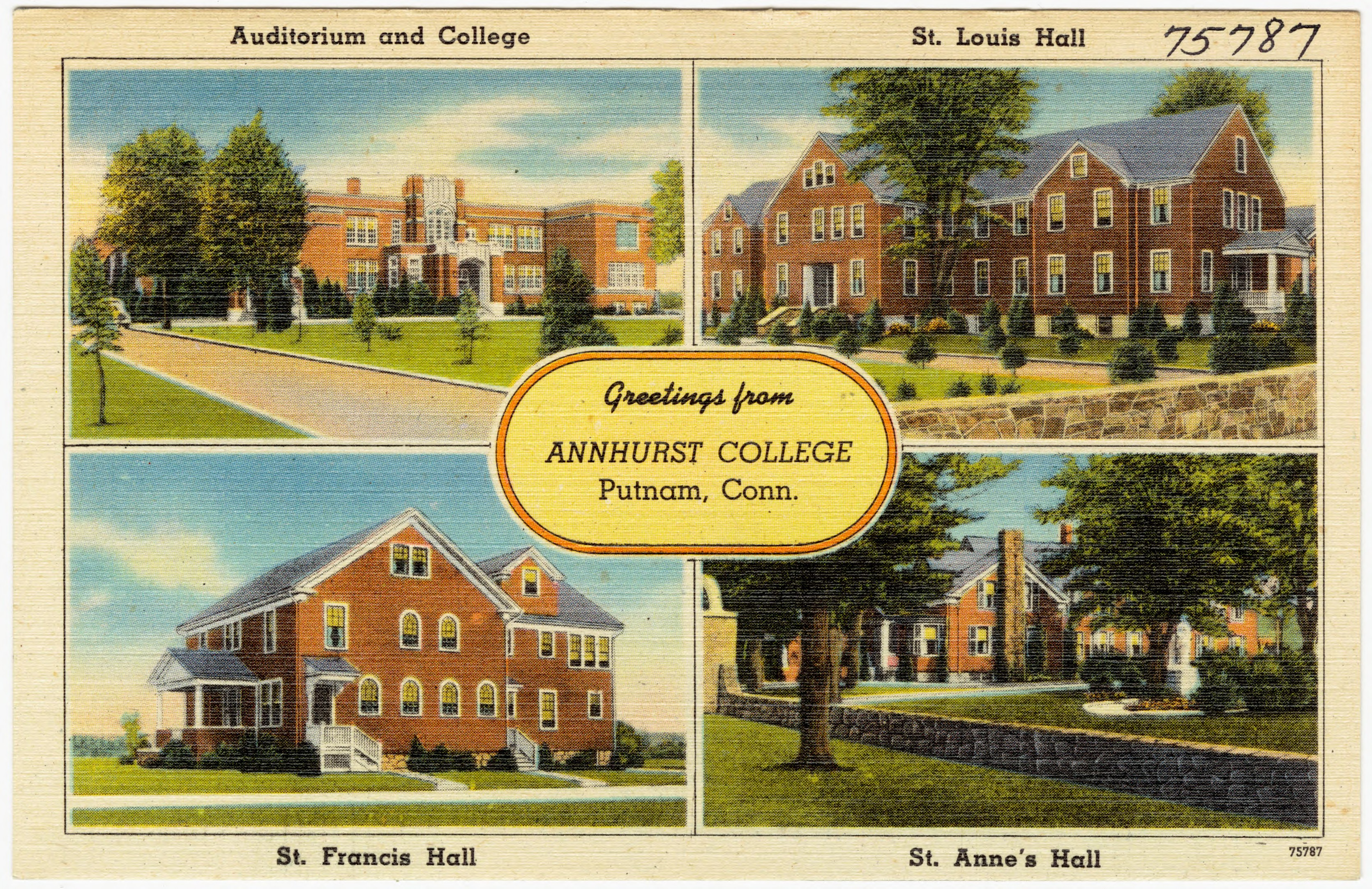
A vintage postcard of Annhurst College.

Annhurst College was founded in 1940 by Mother Marie-Louis du Sacré-Coeur, the Provincial Superior of the American Province of the Daughters of the Holy Spirit, as Ker-Anna Junior College, an all-women's institution. The name honored a major French shrine to Saint Ann located in the village of Sainte-Anne-d'Auray in Brittany, the region of France where the Sisters had been founded and first served. The first classes were held on September 23, 1941. The name was changed two years later, when the school was accredited as a full four-year college by the State of Connecticut. The new name was created as a combination of "Ann" with the Old English suffix "-hurst," referring to the grove-like setting of the campus.

Student life on campus included a newspaper called The Heather, a yearbook called The Sylvan, and athletic programs. An alumnae association was formed in 1945 by the first graduating class. Students called their college "Annie U."

Annhurst had an active arts community. The college sponsored and housed the Eastern Connecticut Performing Arts Group, which had 50 members at the time of the college's closure. In 1967, the college decided to construct a new fine arts building to meet demand; it opened in 1970 as the Annhurst College Cultural Center. Although a private, Catholic college, Annhurst had received state funding for its cultural center's construction. This was found not to be in violation of the Establishment Clause of the United States Constitution by the Supreme Court of the United States in Tilton v. Richardson (1970).

In its final years, administrators tried multiple approaches to counter the college's mounting debt, which reached $4 million (USD) by 1980. Co-educational evening and part-time students were accepted by 1971, with men admitted as full students starting in 1972. The Annhurst International Institute provided English as a second language education to international students. In 1977, the college began offering admission to students with learning disabilities who were unable to complete high school. In an appeal to Catholic students, administrators emphasized philosophy and religion in the curriculum. A month before closing, the college auctioned off physical assets, including its sign.

At its closing in May 1980, Annhurst had 350 students, 25 of whom were male..

== Former campus ==
The rural 180-acre (0.73 km^{2}) campus was sold to Data General Corporation, headquartered in Westborough, Massachusetts. The Data General Facilities group, led by Roland Quillia, converted the college to a Field Engineering training center. The converted Data General field engineering training center opened in November 1981.

In 1997, the campus was sold to Hyde School, based in Bath, Maine.

In 2017, the campus was purchased by the locally based Woodstock Academy. The former Annhurst College Student Center is named Annhurst Hall.

== Notable people ==
Notable alumni include:

- Ralph Brancaccio, artist
- Victor Manuel Gerena, fugitive
- Eileen S. Naughton, politician

Notable faculty and administrators included:

- Magdalena Avietėnaitė, journalist and diplomat - fr Magdalena Avietėnaitė
- Maurice F. McAuliffe, bishop
- Ruth Sawtell Wallis, anthropologist
- Wilson Dallam Wallis, anthropologist

== See also ==
- List of current and historical women's universities and colleges
