= South Woodstock, Connecticut =

- Census-designated place
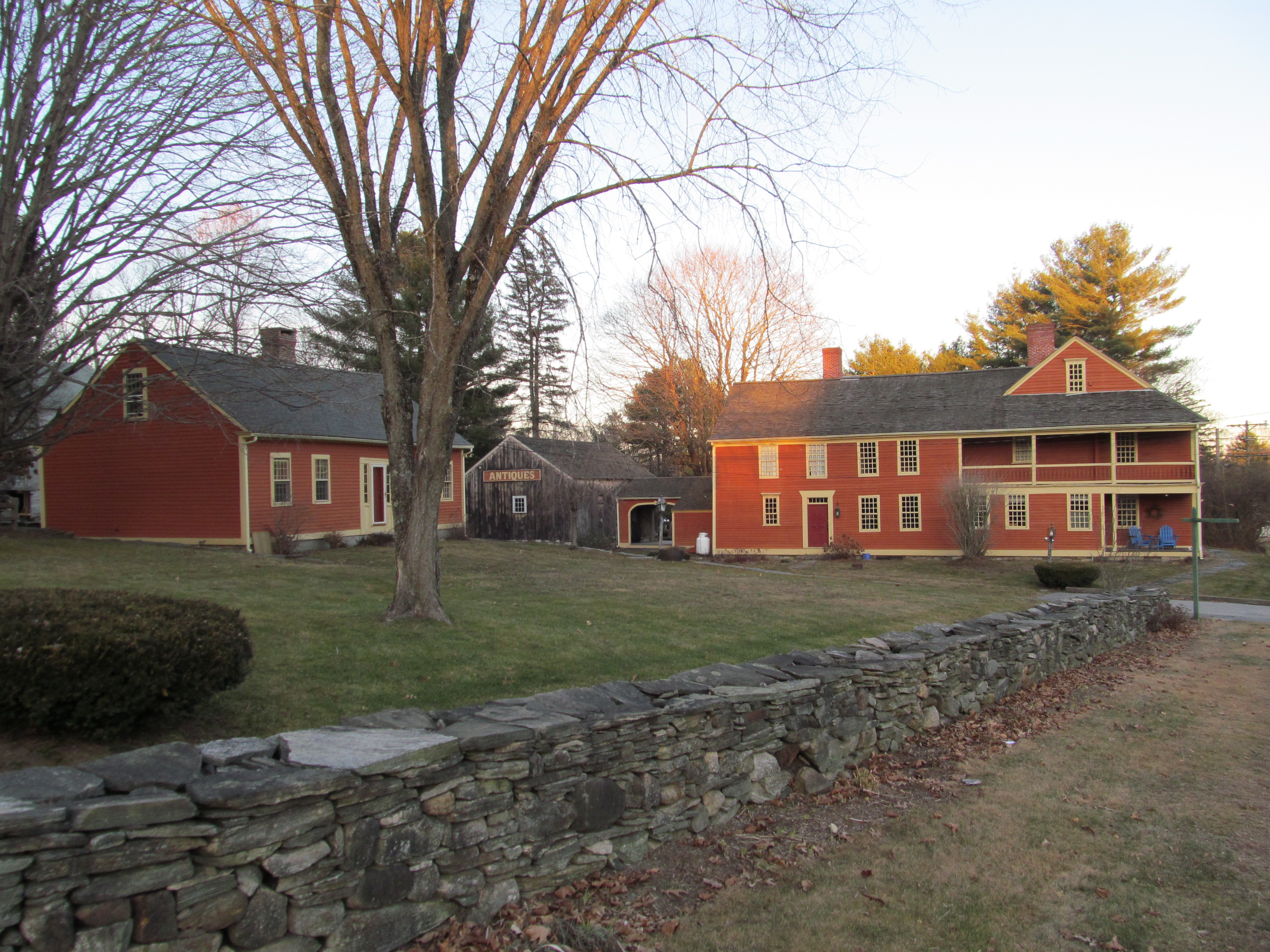
- General Samuel McClellan House

- Location in Windham County and the state of Connecticut.
- Coordinates: 41°56′20″N 71°57′34″W
- Country: United States
- State: Connecticut
- County: Windham
- Town: Woodstock

Area
  - Total: 5.4 sq mi (14 km^{2})
  - Land: 5.4 sq mi (14 km^{2})
  - Water: 0.20 sq mi (0.52 km^{2})
- Elevation: 436 ft (133 m)

Population (2010)
  - Total: 1,291
  - Density: 240/sq mi (92/km^{2})
- Time zone: UTC-5 (Eastern (EST))
  - Summer (DST): UTC-4 (EDT)
- ZIP code: 06281
- Area code: 860
- FIPS code: 09-71530
- GNIS feature ID: 2377865

South Woodstock is a village and census-designated place (CDP) in Woodstock, Connecticut, United States. As of the 2020 census, South Woodstock had a population of 1,493.

It is notable as the former home of the now-defunct Annhurst College.

== Geography ==
According to the United States Census Bureau, the CDP has a total area of 5.4 square miles (14 km^{2}), of which 5.3 square miles (14 km^{2}) is land and 0.2 square miles (0.52 km^{2}) (2.96%) is water.

== Demographics ==
=== 2020 census ===
As of the 2020 census, South Woodstock had a population of 1,493. The median age was 44.9 years. 20.2% of residents were under the age of 18 and 19.0% of residents were 65 years of age or older. For every 100 females there were 91.9 males, and for every 100 females age 18 and over there were 90.7 males age 18 and over.

47.4% of residents lived in urban areas, while 52.6% lived in rural areas.

There were 633 households in South Woodstock, of which 30.5% had children under the age of 18 living in them. Of all households, 49.8% were married-couple households, 14.8% were households with a male householder and no spouse or partner present, and 28.0% were households with a female householder and no spouse or partner present. About 28.8% of all households were made up of individuals and 13.0% had someone living alone who was 65 years of age or older.

There were 677 housing units, of which 6.5% were vacant. The homeowner vacancy rate was 3.0% and the rental vacancy rate was 3.7%.

Racial composition as of the 2020 census
Race	Number	Percent
White	1,344	90.0%
Black or African American	22	1.5%
American Indian and Alaska Native	5	0.3%
Asian	26	1.7%
Native Hawaiian and Other Pacific Islander	0	0.0%
Some other race	10	0.7%
Two or more races	86	5.8%
Hispanic or Latino (of any race)	32	2.1%

=== 2000 census ===
As of the 2000 census, there were 1,211 people, 499 households, and 333 families residing in the CDP. The population density was 230.3 inhabitants per square mile (88.9/km^{2}). There were 565 housing units at an average density of 107.5 per square mile (41.5/km^{2}). The racial makeup of the CDP was 97.19% White, 0.08% African American, 0.08% Native American, 0.58% Asian, 0.17% from other races, and 1.90% from two or more races. Hispanic or Latino of any race were 0.91% of the population.

There were 499 households, out of which 30.7% had children under the age of 18 living with them, 54.7% were married couples living together, 8.2% had a female householder with no husband present, and 33.1% were non-families. 26.3% of all households were made up of individuals, and 10.2% had someone living alone who was 65 years of age or older. The average household size was 2.43 and the average family size was 2.95.

In the CDP the population was spread out, with 25.0% under the age of 18, 7.8% from 18 to 24, 31.4% from 25 to 44, 22.8% from 45 to 64, and 13.0% who were 65 years of age or older. The median age was 38 years. For every 100 females, there were 101.5 males. For every 100 females age 18 and over, there were 93.2 males.

The median income for a household in the CDP was $37,458, and the median income for a family was $44,821. Males had a median income of $38,083 versus $26,140 for females. The per capita income for the CDP was $21,239. None of the families and 3.5% of the population were living below the poverty line, including no under eighteens and 9.9% of those over 64.
