= Ichnaea =

Epithet of Themis

In ancient Greek religion and mythology, Ichnaea (Ancient Greek: Ἰχναία, romanized: Ikhnaía, lit. 'tracker'), is an epithet that could be applied to Themis, as in the Homeric Hymn to Delian Apollo, or to Nemesis, who was venerated at Ichnae, a Greek city in Macedon. One Hellenistic source presented her as an independent figure, a daughter of Helios.

== Mythology ==
At the birth of Apollo on Delos according to the Homeric hymn, the goddesses who bear witness to the rightness of the birth are the great goddesses of the old order: Dione, Rhea, the Ichnaean goddess, Themis, and the sea-goddess "loud-moaning" Amphitrite. Strabo, in his Geographica, says that the "Ichnaean Themis" is worshipped at the town of Ichnae, and William Smith suggests that the name "may have been derived" from the town.

Lycophron evokes her in Alexandra: "...like Guneus, a doer of justice and arbiter of the Sun's daughter Ichnae".

== See also ==
- Dike
- Astraea
- Lady Justice
