= Sturgis =

Sturgis may refer to:

== Places ==
=== Canada ===
- Sturgis, Saskatchewan, a town in the east central region

=== United States ===
- Sturgis, Kentucky, a city in Union County
- Sturgis, Michigan, a city in St. Joseph County
- Sturgis Township, Michigan, a township in St. Joseph County
- Sturgis, Mississippi, a town in Oktibbeha County
- Sturgis, Oklahoma, an unincorporated place in Cimarron County
- Sturgis, South Dakota, a city in Meade County

== Other uses ==
- Sturgis Charter Public School, a high school in Hyannis, Massachusetts
- The Sturgis, MH-1A, the first floating nuclear power plant
- Sturgis Motorcycle Rally, an annual event in Sturgis, South Dakota
- Sturgis station, a railway station in Sturgis, Saskatchewan
- Sturgis Rifles, an Illinois Civil War unit
- Sturgis (surname)

== See also ==
- Sturges, surnames and other uses
- Turgis (disambiguation)
