= Turgis =

Turgis may refer to:

== Surname ==
- Agathe Turgis (fl. 1892–1936), French fencer
- Anthony Turgis (born 1994), French cyclist
- Claude Turgis de Saint-Étienne de la Tour, French colonist in Acadia
- Thomas Turgis (1623–1704), English politician

== Places ==
- Stratfield Turgis, a village and civil parish in the English county of Hampshire
  - Turgis Green, a hamlet in the civil parish
- Lieu-Turgis (Le), a hamlet at la Cambe, Normandy
- Turgis (crater), on Saturn's moon Iapetus

== See also ==
- Sturges, a surname
- Sturgis (surname)
- Turgi, a municipality in the canton of Aargau, Switzerland
- Hamel-Tourgis (Le), hamlet at Montchauvet, Calvados, Normandy
- Tourgéville (Torgisvilla in 1185), a French commune in Normandy
