= Sturgess =

Sturgess is a surname. Notable people with the surname include:

- Albert Sturgess (1882–1957), English footballer
- Claire Sturgess (born 1967), British disc jockey
- Colin Sturgess (born 1968), British road and track cyclist
- Dawn Sturgess (1974–2018), British poison victim
- Eric Sturgess (1920–2004), South African tennis player
- Gary Sturgess (21st century), Australian businessperson
- Jim Sturgess (born 1978), English actor
- John Sturgess (19th century), English artist
- Kylie Sturgess (21st century), Australian educator and researcher
- Olive Sturgess (born 1933), Canadian-American actress
- Paul Sturgess (footballer) (born 1975), English footballer
- Paul Sturgess (basketball) (born 1987), British basketball player
- Reginald Sturgess (1892–1932), Australian artist
- Sydney Sturgess (1915–1999), Canadian actress
- Thomas Sturgess (1898–1974), Indian cricketer

== See also ==
- Sturges
