= Sturgis (surname) =

Sturgis is a surname of Norman origin, shortened form of FitzTurgis "son of" (see Fitz) "Turgis" (former first name, now still common as a Norman surname, together with "Tourgis") from the Old Norse Þórgísl or Old Danish Thorgisl ( the name of the god Thor, and -gísl "hostage, pledge" or ON geisli "ray, pole (part of a weapon)" or OW. Norse geisl "staff", cf. Old Icelandic geisli "sun-shaft, sun beam"). It corresponds to the Nordic patronymic Þórgilsson (f. e. Ari Þorgilsson).

== People with the name ==
- Alice Sturgis (1885–1974), American author and parliamentarian
- Amy H. Sturgis (born 1971), American author
- Ann Sturgis (born 1956), American First Lady of North Carolina
- Caleb Sturgis (born 1989), American football player
- Cambrea Sturgis (born 1999), American sprinter
- Ellen Sturgis Hooper (1812–1848), American poet, daughter of William F
- Frank Sturgis (1924–1993), American covert operative and Watergate burglar
- Henry Parkman Sturgis (1847–1929), British banker and politician
- Howard Sturgis (1855–1920), English-born author
- John Hubbard Sturgis (1834–1888), American architect, son of Russell
- John Sturgis, journalist on The Sun, arrested in Operation Elveden in 2012
- Julian Sturgis (1848–1904), American-British author
- Matthew Sturgis, British historian and biographer
- Nathan Sturgis (born 1987), American soccer player
- Richard Clipston Sturgis (1860–1951), American architect, nephew of John Hubbard
- Russell Sturgis (1836–1909), American architect
- Russell Sturgis (1750–1826), American merchant and grandfather of Russell
- Russell Sturgis (1805–1887), American-English merchant and banker
- Samuel D. Sturgis (1822–1889), American general
- Samuel D. Sturgis III (1897–1964), American major general, grandson of Samuel
- William Codman Sturgis (1862–1942), American mycologist
- William F. Sturgis (1782–1863), American merchant
- William R. Sturgis (1817–1901), Canadian-American politician, farmer, and politician

== See also ==
- Sturgis (disambiguation)
- Sturges
- Turgis (disambiguation)
