= John Sturges (disambiguation) =

John Sturges is a film director.

John Sturges(s) may also refer to:

- John Sturges (priest)
- John Sturges (photographer) known as Jock
- John Sturgess, artist

== See also ==
- John Sturgis (disambiguation)
