= Latona Fountain =

Fountain in the Gardens of Versailles

Coordinates: 48°48′20″N 2°07′04″E

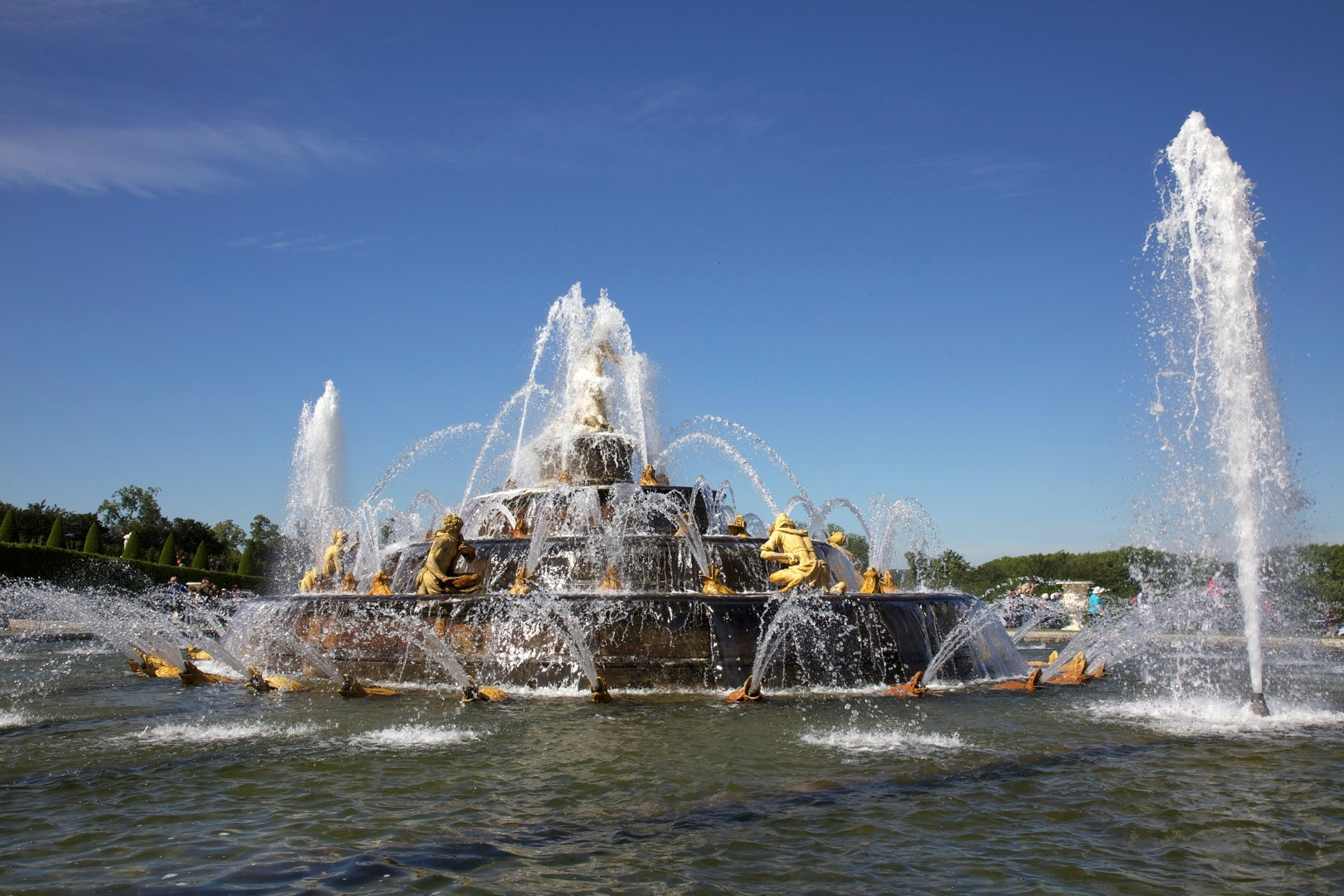

The Latona Fountain in the Gardens of Versailles lies in the Latona Basin between the Palace of Versailles and the Grand Canal. On the top tier, there is a statue of the goddess Latona, mother of the sun and moon gods. The fountain operates three times a week during the high season.

== Myth of Latona ==
The theme of the Latona Fountain is taken from the myth of Latona (the Roman incarnation of the Greek goddess Leto), as vividly told in Book VI of the Metamorphoses of Ovid. Latona bore the gods Apollo and Diana by Zeus, which incurred the hatred of Zeus' consort Juno. She forbade any mortals to give hospitality to Latona and her children, who were forced to wander the earth fleeing Juno's persecution, until at last they came to Lycia. A thirsty Latona attempted to drink from a local pond, but the inhabitants, obeying Juno's command, waded into the water and kicked up the mud from the bottom of the pond, so that Latona and her children could not drink. Enraged at their treatment of her, Latona cursed the Lycians to live in their pond forever, and they were transformed into frogs as punishment.

== History & design ==
The fountain was begun in 1670 by André Le Nôtre, then enlarged and modified by Jules Hardouin-Mansart in 1686. In 1667 the sculptor brothers Gaspard and Balthazard Marsy were employed to embellish the basin with statuary. Balthazard created six lead half-human, half-frog sculptures placed around the perimeter of the basin, and between 1668 and 1670 Gaspard created the main statuary group of Latona with Diana and Apollo. The statue was placed on a low foundation of rocks at the center of the fountain, from where Latona faced eastwards toward the palace.

Hardouin-Mansart designed a much grander fountain of four oval tiers forming a pyramid, topped by Gaspard Marsy's statue (looking west over the gardens and the Grand Canal rather than towards the palace) and enhanced all around with the original figures of Balthazard Marsy and an assortment of gilded frogs and lizards sculpted by Claude Bertin. The four tiers are covered in 230 pieces of marble, composed of the white and grey-veined Cararra, greenish marble from Campan, and red marble from Languedoc.

== Restoration ==
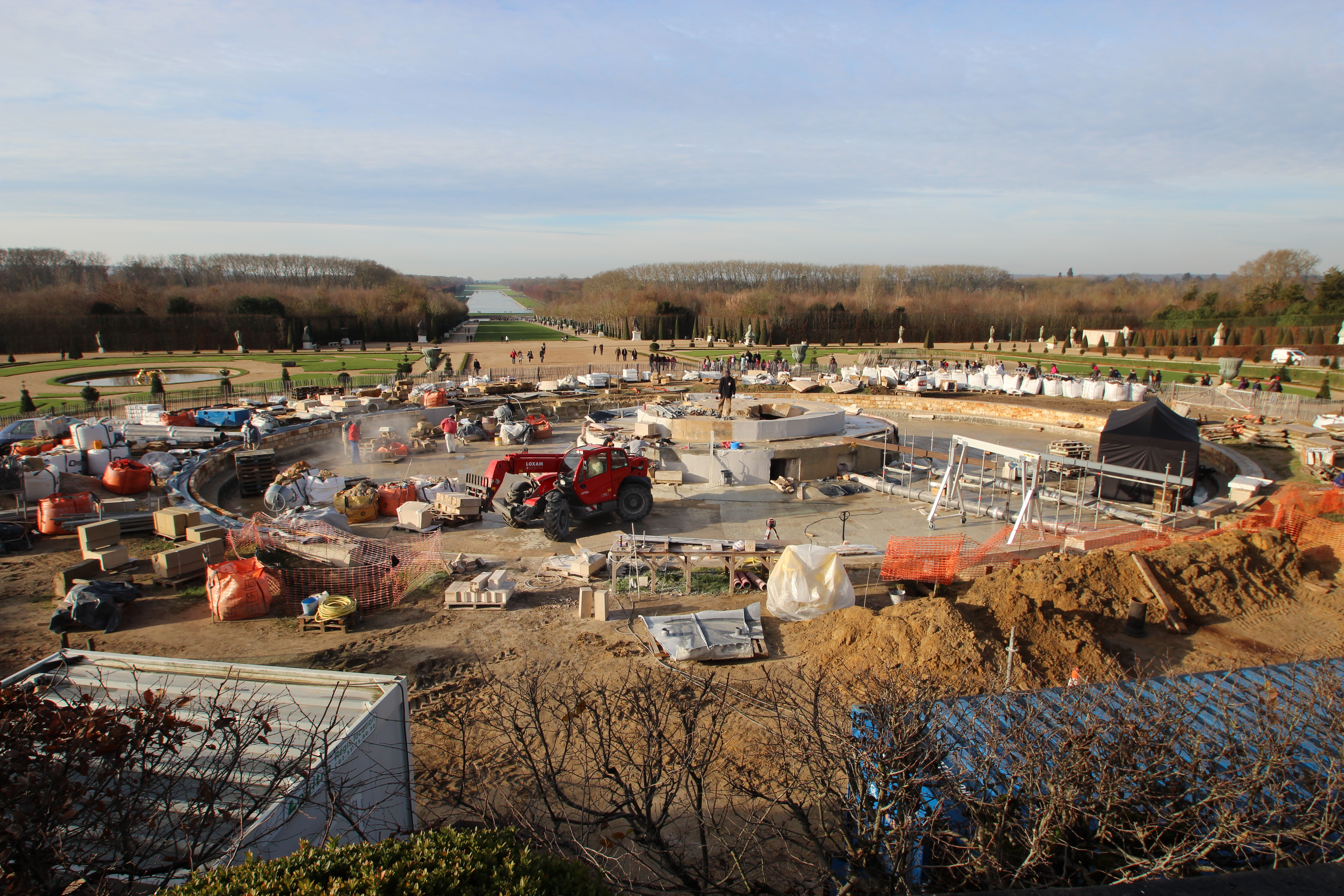
The reconstruction of the Latona Fountain after restoration work, December 2014

The Latona Fountain underwent an "emergency" renovation between 2013 and 2015, after it was determined that the integrity of the basin supporting the fountain was threatened. The fountain itself was in a serious state of neglect, requiring total dismantlement for off-site restoration of individual parts. This included 230 pieces of marble which were cleaned and repaired, as well as the re-gilding of the frog and lizard lead fixtures. The elaborate system of lead pipes underpinning the fountain was also repaired by the fountain engineers of Versailles. The fountain was formally reopened in May 2015.

== Legacy ==
The Latona Fountain has been cited as inspiration for Buckingham Fountain in Chicago.

== Panorama ==
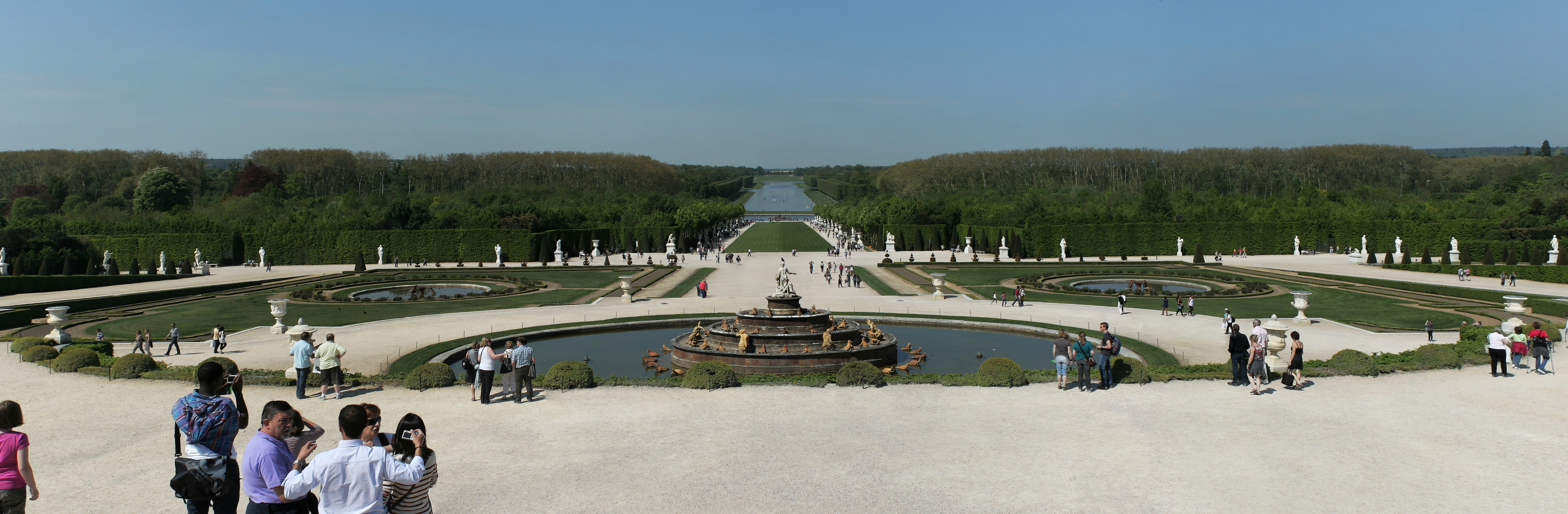
Panorama of the Latona Basin with the Grand Canal in the background
