= John Sturgis =

John Sturgis may refer to:

- John Hubbard Sturgis (1834–1888), American architect and builder
- John H. Sturgis (1863–1949), American politician from Maine
- John Sturgis (Young Sheldon), a fictional character

== See also ==
- John Sturges (disambiguation)
