= Lycian peasants =

Ancient Greek myth

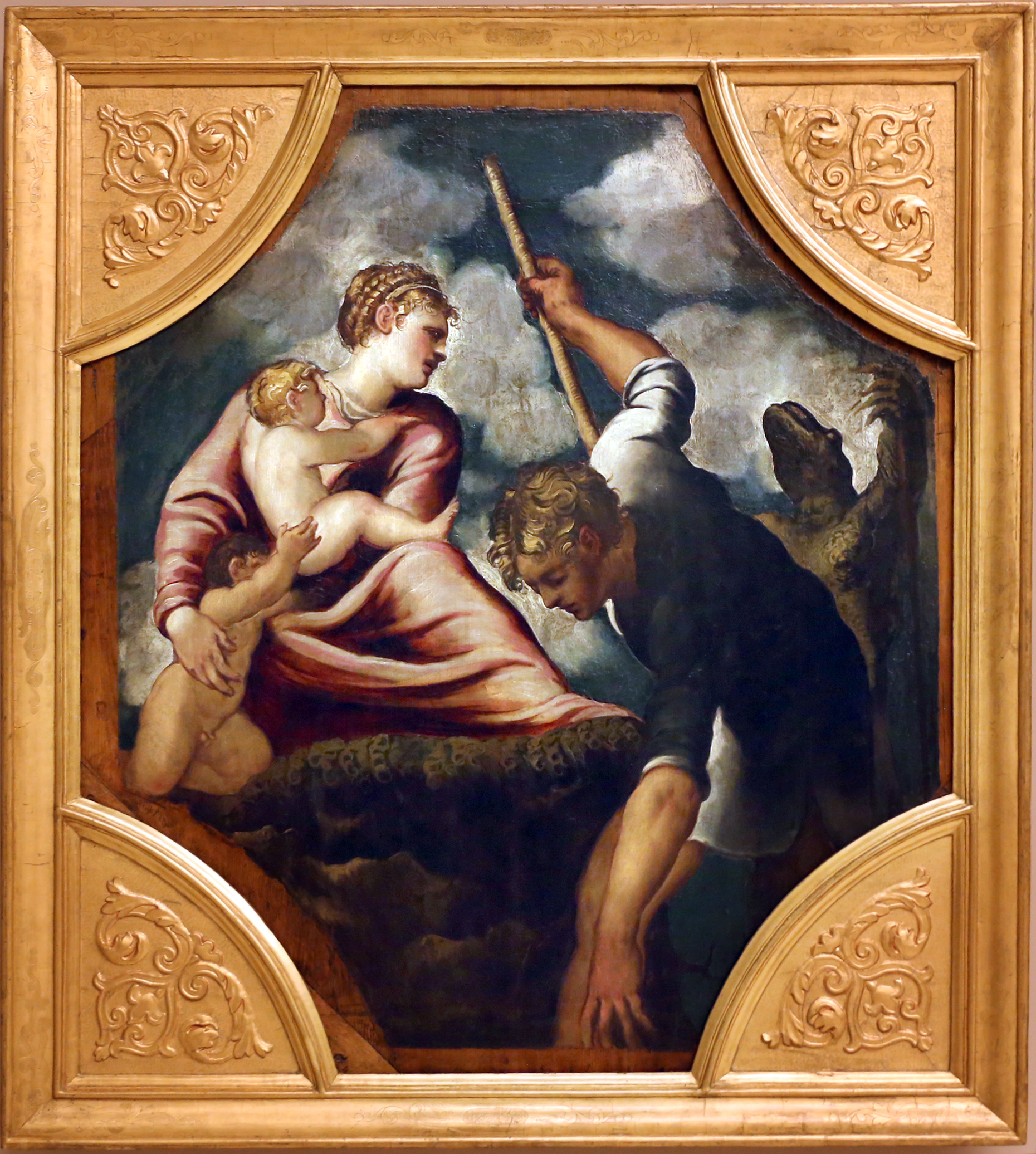
Latona transforms the Lycian peasants into frogs, Palazzo dei Musei (Modena).

The Lycian peasants, also known as Latona and the Lycian peasants, is a short tale from ancient Greek and Roman mythology centered around Leto (known to the Romans as Latona), the mother of the Olympian twin gods Artemis and Apollo, who after much exhausting wandering was prohibited from drinking water from a pond in Lycia by the unhospitable people living there. The goddess then turned the peasants into frogs as punishment.

The myth's theme tackles the ancient Greek concept of xenia, or sacred hospitality, as well as Leto's special connection to the land of Lycia, a historical region in southwestern Asia Minor. The impious Lycians refuse to exercise the due hospitality, the ritualized guest-friendship termed xenia by the ancient Greeks, or else also called theoxenia, which refers specifically to the instances when a god, such as Leto and her infant children, is involved.

This myth is most famously known from Ovid's rendition of it in his first-century narrative poem the Metamorphoses. The myth has inspired a lot of post-classical art.

== Mythology ==
The story of the Lycian peasants is a short one; legend says that after a very troubling labour on Delos, the goddess Leto took her newborn infants, Artemis and Apollo, and crossed over to Lycia (a region in southwestern Asia Minor) where she attempted to bathe her children in and drink from a spring she found there. But the local people tried to stop her, stirring the bottom of the spring so that the mud would come up. Enraged over their lack of hospitality, Leto turned them all into frogs, forever doomed to swim and hop in the murky waters of the spring.

The grammarian Servius implied that the birth of the twins took place between her two visits to Lycia, the first in which she was rejected, and the second where she returned to enact her punishment. Antoninus Liberalis mentions that the spring Leto tried to drink from on her way to the river Xanthos was called Melite; after being driven away by cattle herders who wished to keep the water for their cattle, some wolves befriended her and led her to the Xanthos, where she bathed her children. She then returned to the spring to transform the Lycians into frogs.

One of the Vatican Mythographers records the story and supplants Leto with Ceres/Demeter, who tried to drink from the spring, thirsty as she was after days of looking for her abducted daughter Persephone, who had been snatched by Hades, the king of the Underworld. The anonymous author is the only one to record the variation with Demeter.

== Symbolism ==
=== Lycian Leto ===
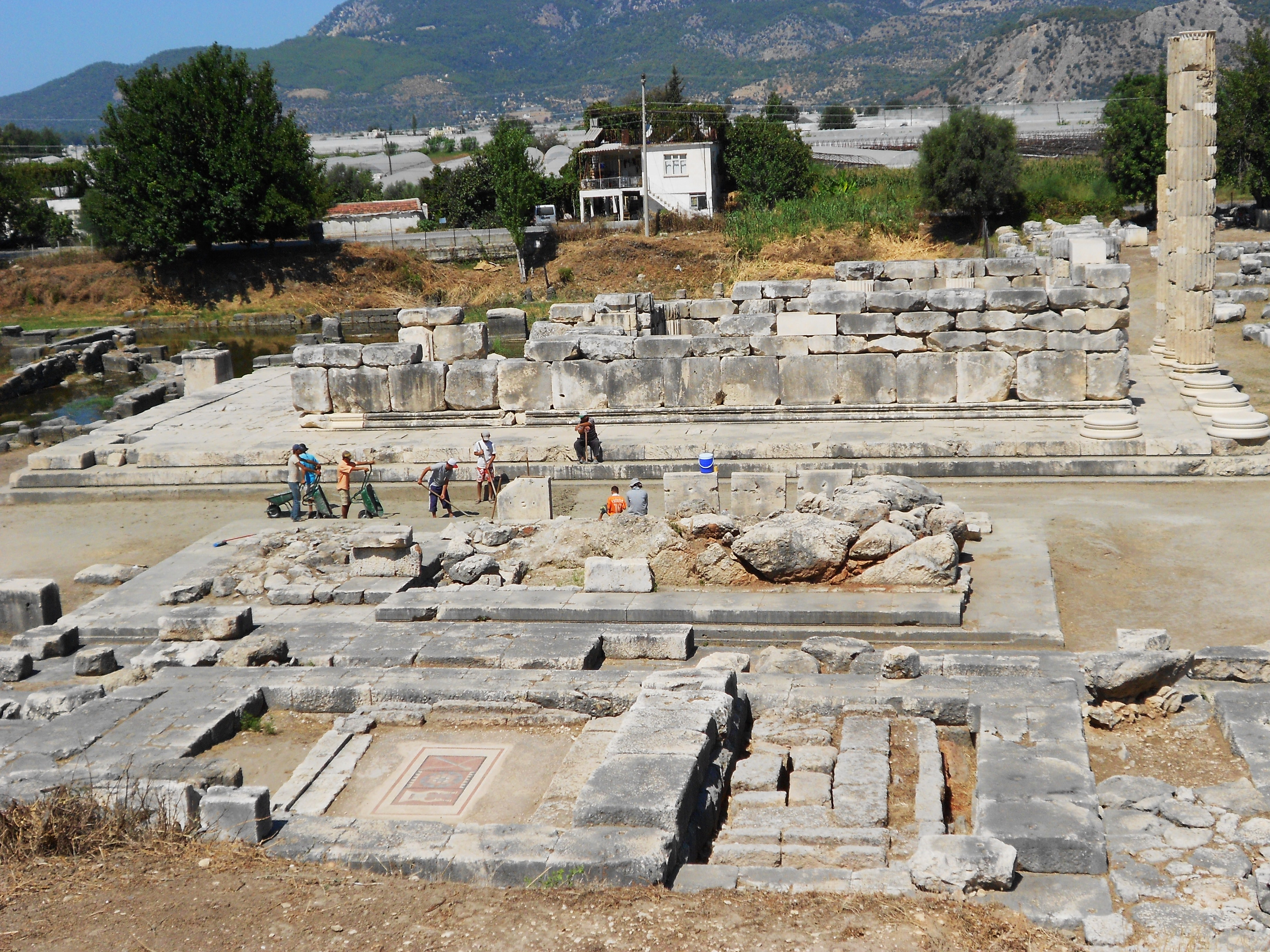
Temples at Letoon.

Leto was particularly worshipped in Lycia, and was seen as the 'national deity' of the Lycians, and similarly Lycia was an important cult center for her two children as well. Leto had an important sanctuary, the Letoon, in Lycia, just west of the city of Xanthos, along the Xanthos river. Traditionally, the etymology offered for Leto's (Ancient Greek: Λητώ, romanized: Lētṓ) name has even been the Lycian word lada, meaning 'wife', although other scholars like Paul Kretschmer and Robert S. P. Beekes have suggested a pre-Greek origin instead. Although not explicitly stated, it is implied, and apparently understood in antiquity, that the site where the confrontation between Leto and the Lycians took place was the same where the Letoon was erected, as the description matches geography.

The region's name Lycia had been (erroneously) connected by the ancient Greeks to their word for wolf, lykos, and held that the land had taken its name after the friendly wolves who, unlike the rejecting humans, showed hospitality to Leto. Similarly, Leto's son Apollo bore the epithet Lyceus, an epithet which, although usually indicating his youth and connection to light (lyke), had been interpreted occasionally to denote Apollo's connection to wolves and Lycia.

Stephanos of Byzantium recounts a story of how an elderly Lycian woman named Syessa received and entertained Leto in her cottage, a sharp contrast to the unhospitable peasants, and more like the friendly wolves; Polycharmos held that Apollo and Leto had been both born in Araxa, up in the Xanthos valley, which seems to be a Hellenistic innovation. Stitching those fragments together, a story can be assembled, in which the twins are born in Araxa, Leto arrives in Xanthos, the wolves lead her to the water while Syessa offers her food, and Leto finally establishes her shrine. Thanks to Antoninus Liberalis citing the earlier writers Menecrates of Ephesus and Nicander as the sources for his tale, Leto's arrival in Lycia can be dated to around the early fourth century BC, a period during which the city of Xanthos would have been a mixed settlement of Greeks and local Lycians.

=== Hospitality ===
Xenia, in an ancient Greek concept, is understood to mean 'guest-friendship' or 'ritualized friendship', and was an institutionalized relationship rooted in generosity, gift exchange, and reciprocity. Offering hospitality to strangers, whether ethnic Greeks or foreigners, was seen as a moral obligation, and was based on two basic rules; the respect of the hosts towards the guests, who must provide a meal, bath and gifts, and the respect of the guests towards the hosts, who have to be courteous and not overstay their welcome.

The Lycian peasants, who callously attempted to stop a fatigued mother and her young children from using the water of the pond thus broke a very sacred rule and concept of ancient Greek culture, and thus paid by being transformed into creatures that were regarded as hideous and disgusting.

== Art ==
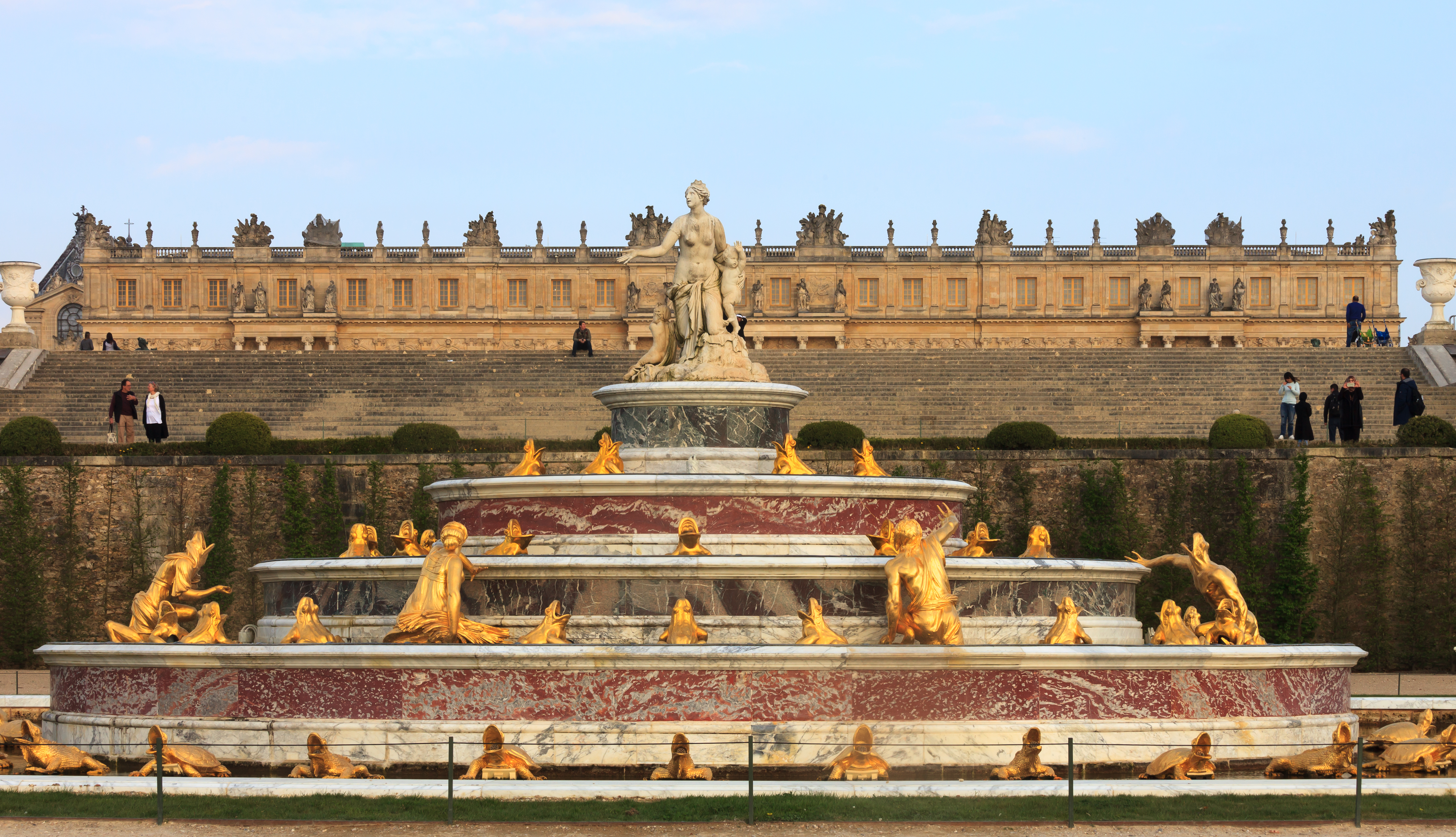
Fountain of Latona, Versailles.

In post-antiquity art, the myth of Leto's transformation of the peasants into frogs of the pond became very popular, the most popular depiction of Leto. This scene, dubbed called Latona and the Lycian Peasants or Latona and the Frogs, became very popular in Northern Mannerist art, as it allowed a combination of mythology with landscape painting and scenes of peasantry, combining history painting and genre painting. In later art, the Lycian peasants became the scene in which Leto exclusively appeared in. In paintings, Leto is usually portrayed with the two little children by the lake, while the peasants, about to be changed into frogs, are in a short distance away from her.

In the Gardens of Versailles, France, lies the Latona Fountain, built in 1670, which depicts the myth; on the top tier stands a statue of Leto with her children Artemis and Apollo surrounded by six lead half-human, half-frog sculptures placed around the perimeter of the basin. The four tiers are covered in 230 pieces of marble, composed of the white and grey-veined Cararra, greenish marble from Campan, and red marble from Languedoc. A copy of the Latona fountain was built in the gardens of Herrenchiemsee, a palace complex in Bavaria, Germany.

The tale has also inspired music, like the Verwandlung der lycischen Bauern in Frösche ("Transformation of the Lycian Peasants into Frogs") by Austrian composer Carl Ditters von Dittersdorf, one among the several symphonies composed based on tales from Ovid's Metamorphoses.

== Gallery ==
Latona and the Lycian Peasants

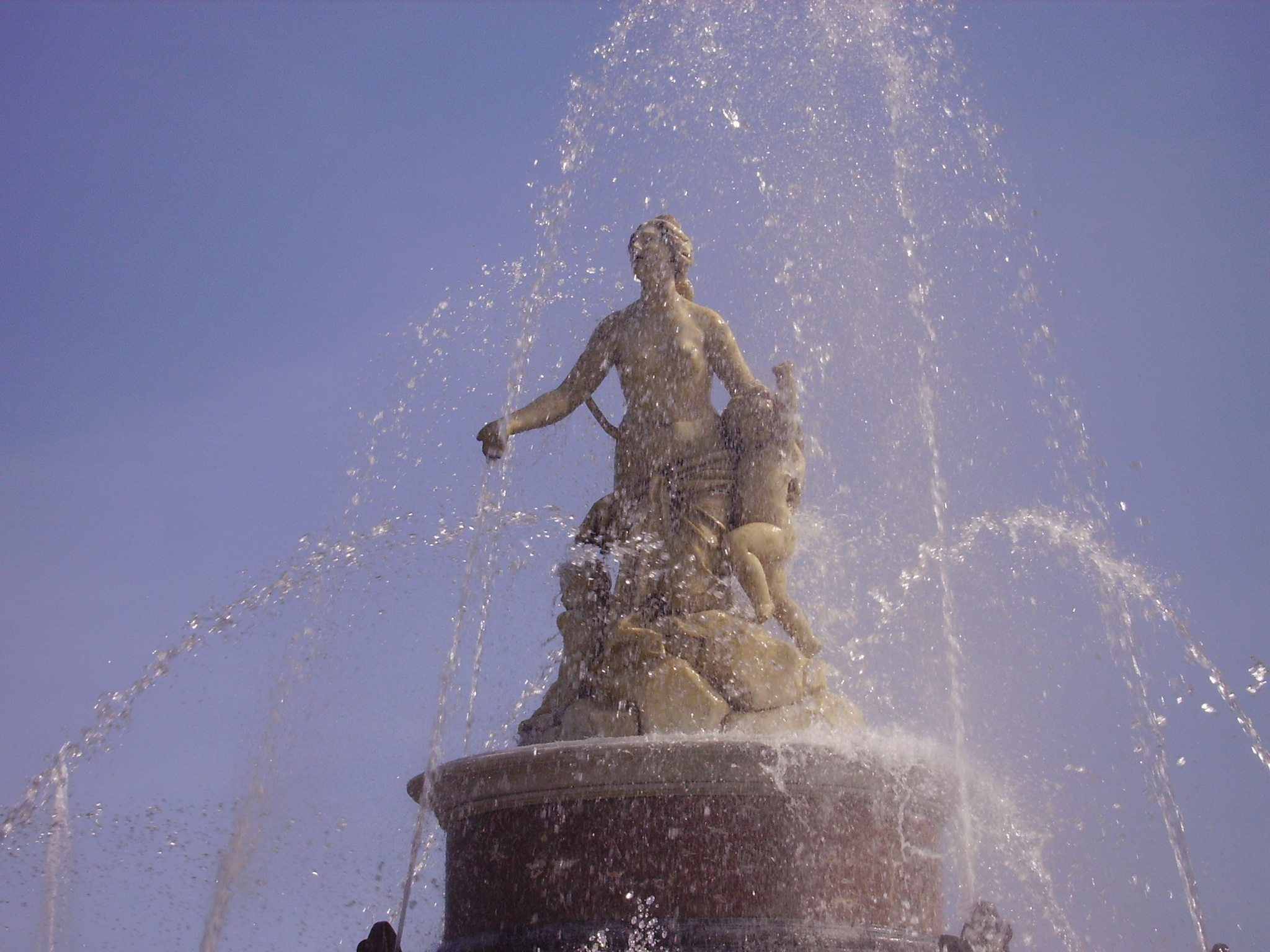
Leto in the Fountain on Herreninsel, Chiemsee.

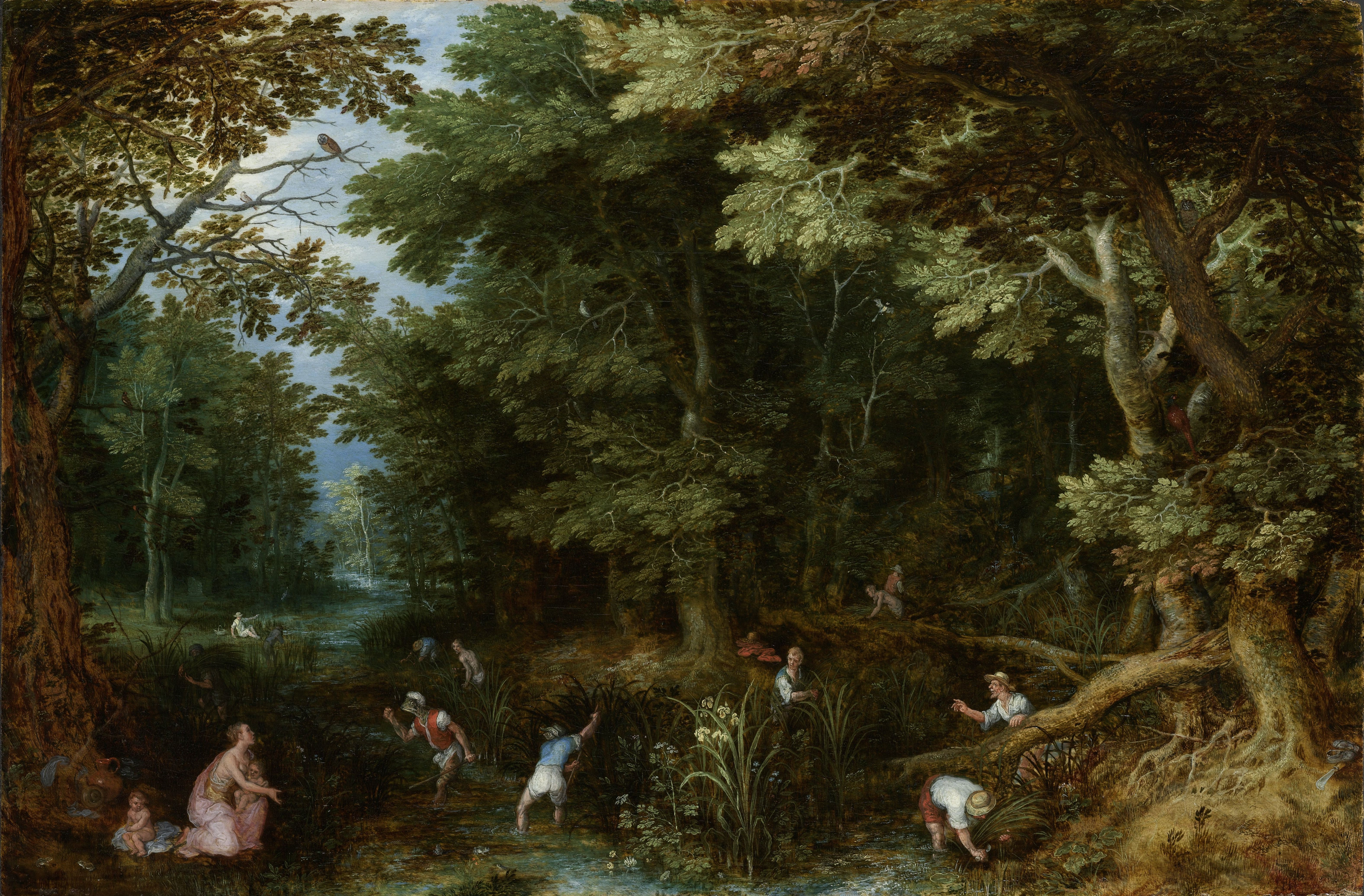
Latona and the Lycian Peasants, ca. 1605, by Jan Brueghel the Elder.

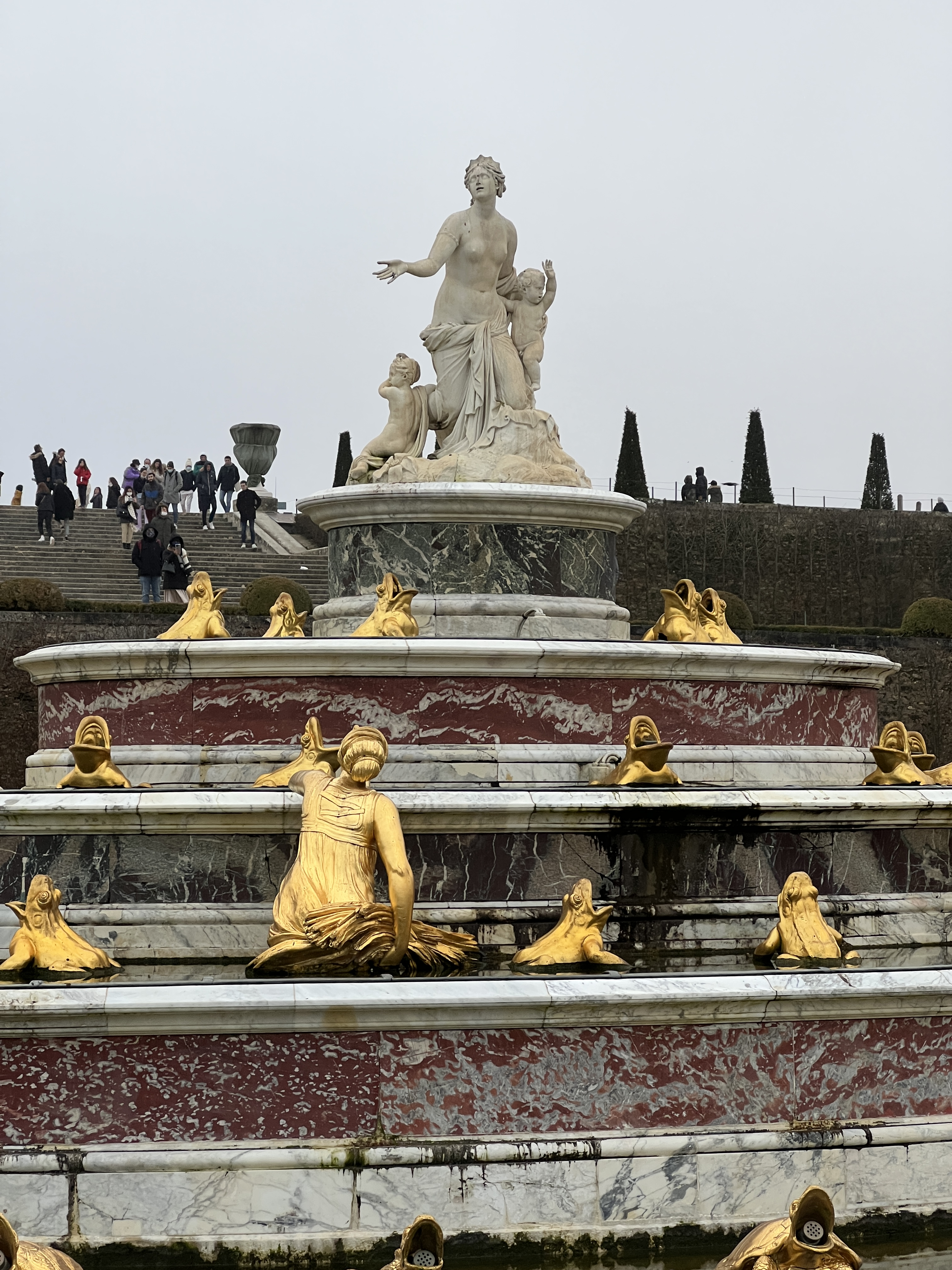
Fountain of Latona, Versailles.

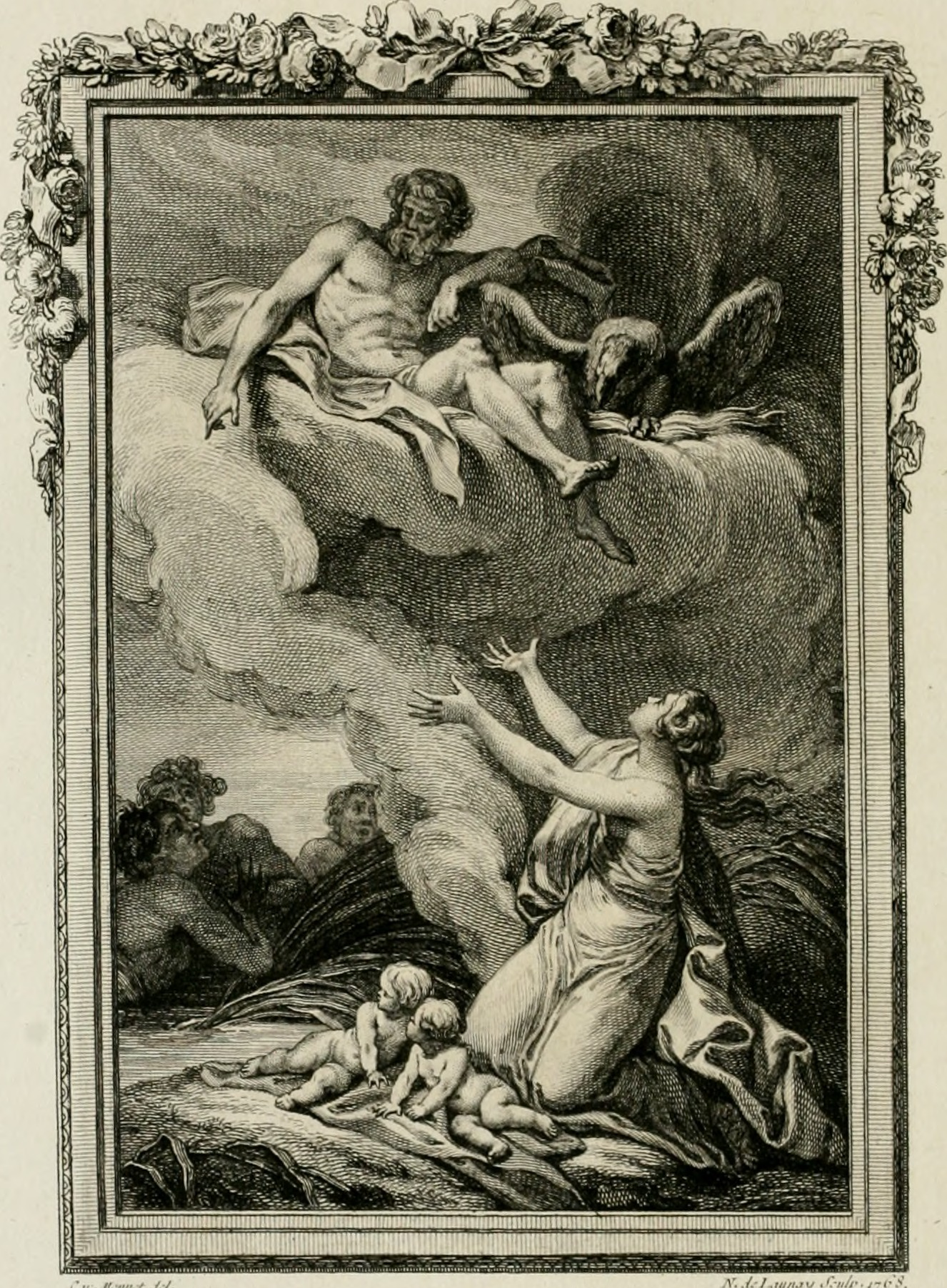
Leto and the Lycian peasants.

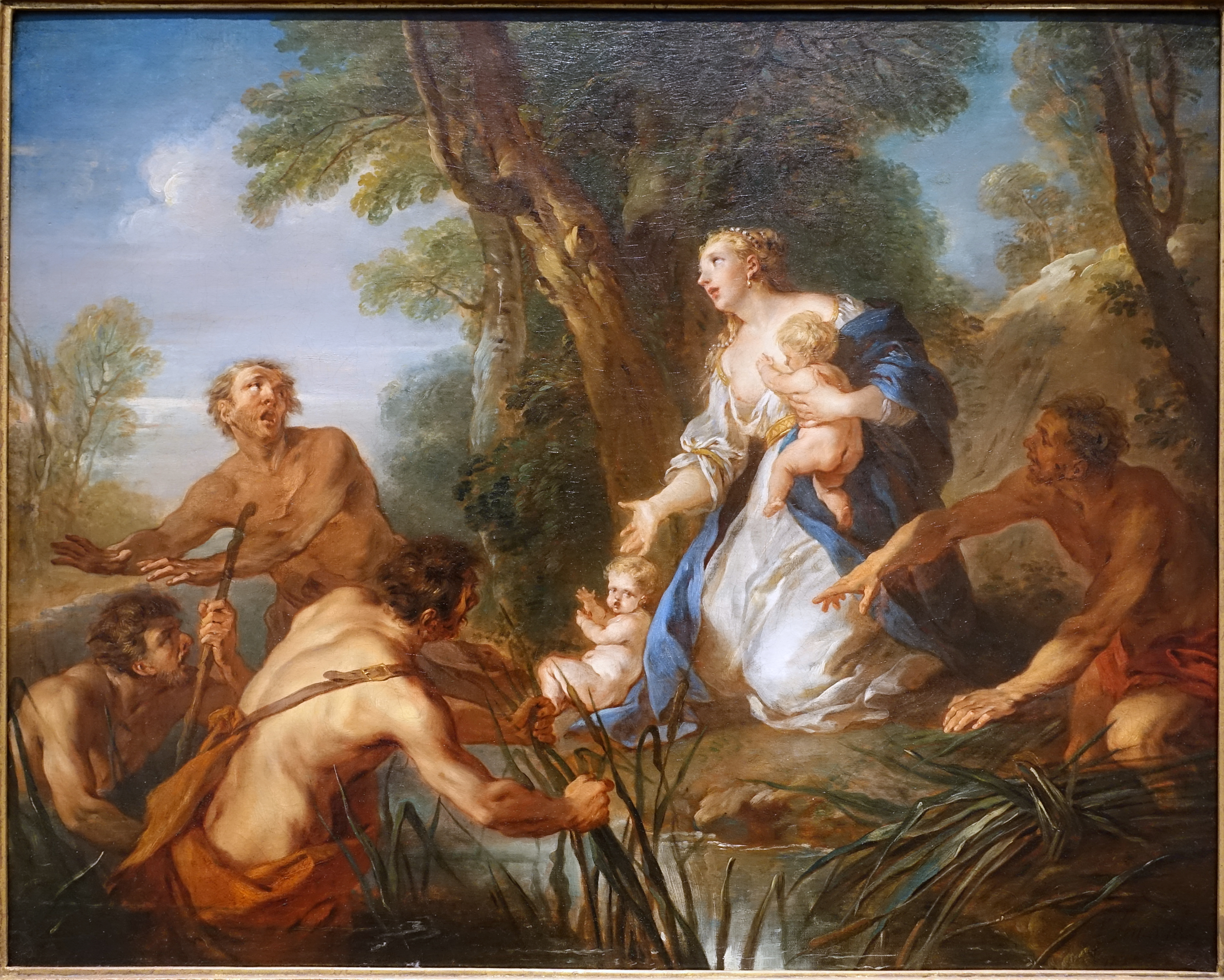
Latona and the Peasants of Lycia, by Francois Lemoyne, 1721, oil on canvas.

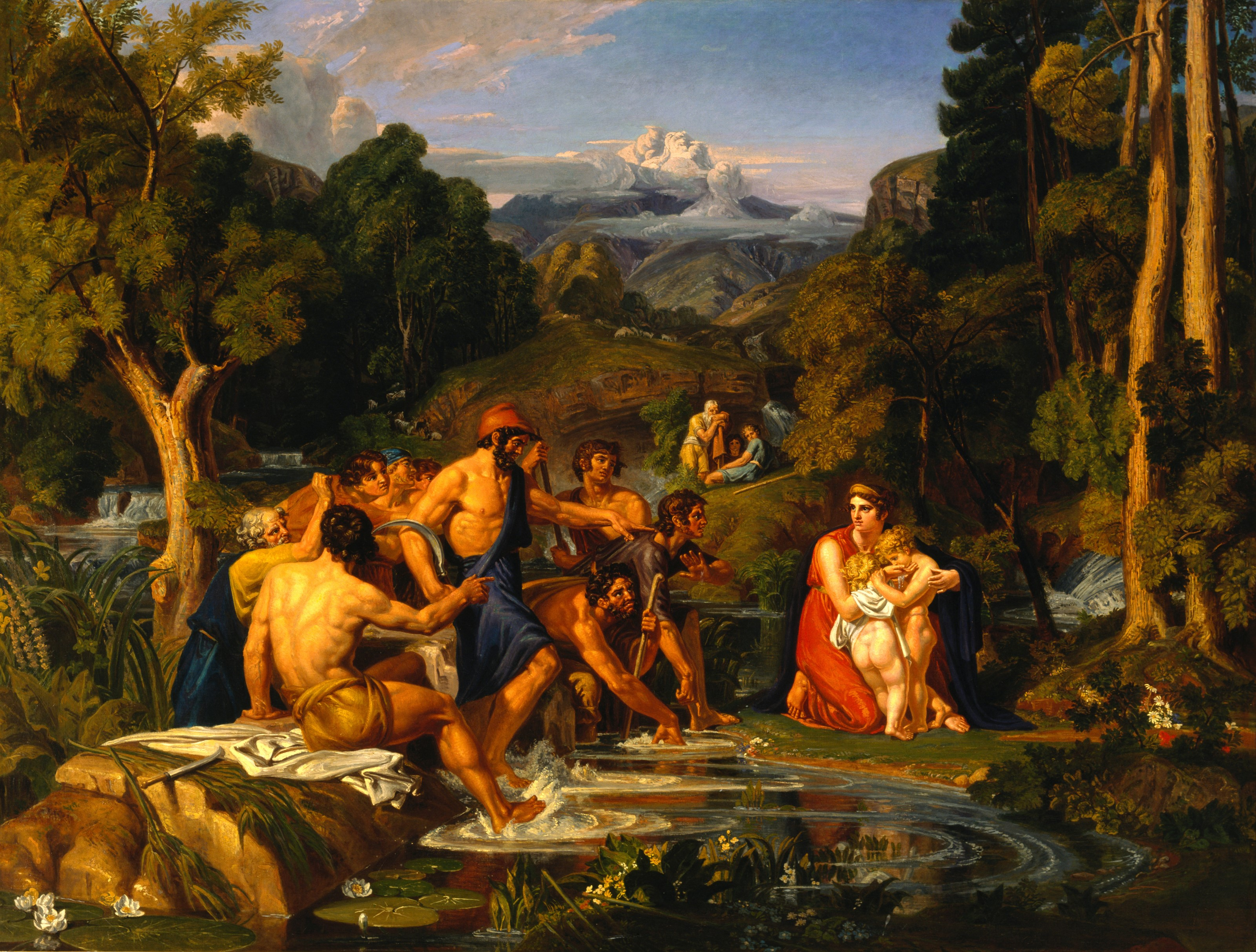
Latona by Joshua Cristall.

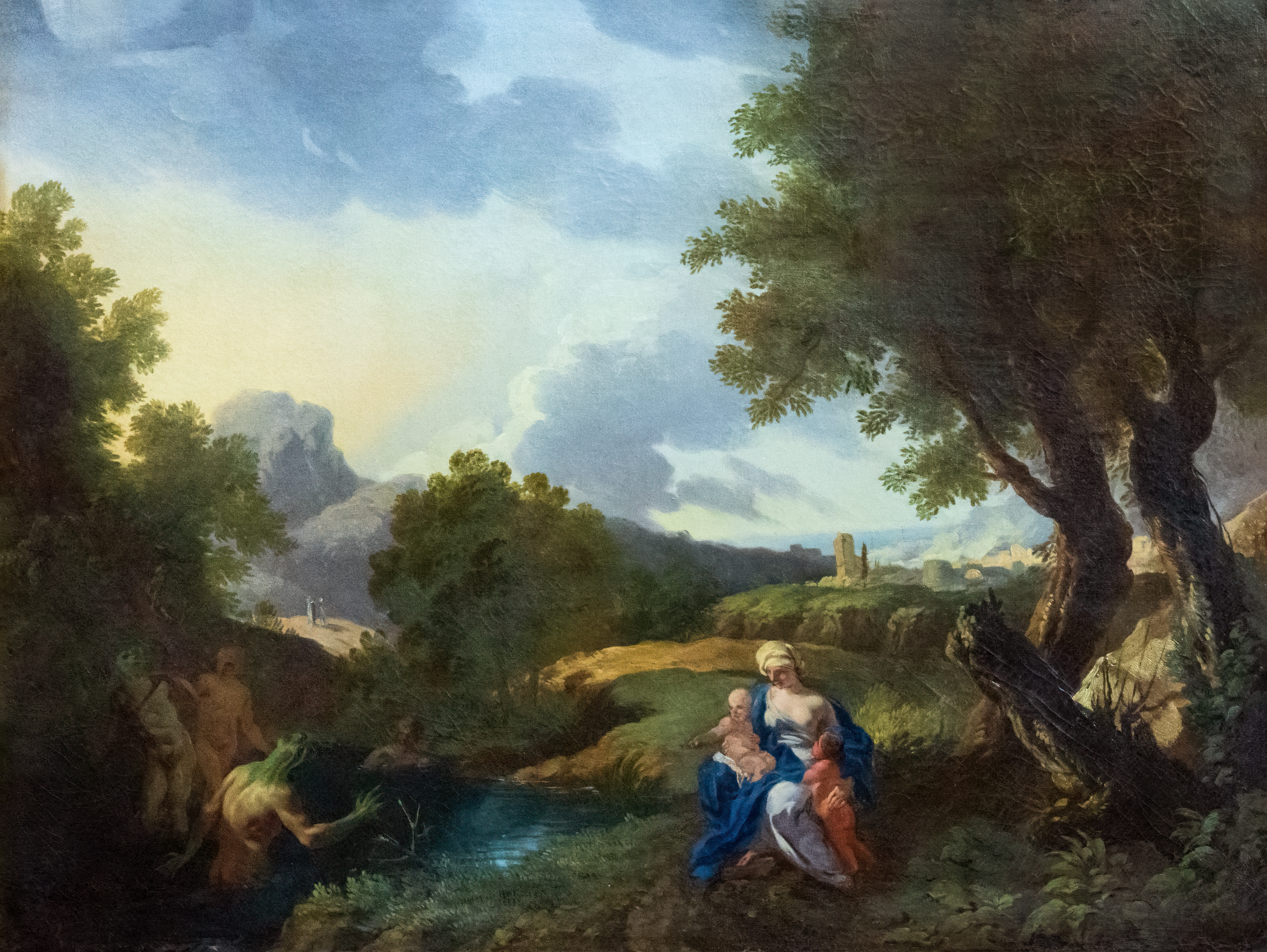
Latona and the peasants of Lycia, by Andrea Locatelli, ca 1720–1741.

== See also ==
- Baucis and Philemon
- Lycaon
- Milk of Hera
- Polyphemus

== Bibliography ==
- Antoninus Liberalis, The Metamorphoses of Antoninus Liberalis translated by Francis Celoria (Routledge 1992). Online version at the Topos Text Project.
- Beekes, Robert S. P. (2009). Lucien van Beek (ed.). Etymological Dictionary of Greek. Leiden Indo-European Etymological Dictionary Series. Vol. 1. Leiden, the Netherlands: Brill Publications. ISBN 978-90-04-17420-7.
- Bell, Robert E. (1991). Women of Classical Mythology: A Biographical Dictionary. ABC-Clio. ISBN 9780874365818.
- Bryce, T. R. (1983). "The Arrival of the Goddess Leto in Lycia". Historia: Zeitschrift für Alte Geschichte. 32 (1). JSTOR: 1–13. JSTOR 4435828.
- Bull, Malcolm (2005). The Mirror of the Gods, How Renaissance Artists Rediscovered the Pagan Gods. Oxford: Oxford University Press. ISBN 0-19-521923-6.
- Celoria, Francis (1992). The Metamorphoses of Antoninus Liberalis: A Translation with a Commentary. Routledge. ISBN 0-415-06896-7.
- Collins, Adela Yarbro (August 13, 2001). The Combat Myth in the Book of Revelation. Wipf and Stock Publishers. ISBN 1-57910-716-8.
- Fowler, Robert L. (2013). Early Greek Mythography. Vol. 2: Commentary. Oxford University Press. ISBN 978-0198147411.
- Impelluso, Lucia (2002). Gods and Heroes in Art. Translated by Thomas Michael Hartmann. Getty Publications for the United States. ISBN 9780892367023.
- Johnston, Sarah Iles (December 3, 2018). The Story of Myth. London, England: Harvard University Press. ISBN 978-0-674-98955-9.
- Littleton, C. Scott (2005). Gods, Goddesses and Mythology. Vol. 6. Marshall Cavendish. ISBN 0-7614-7565-6.
- Ovid (1916). Metamorphoses. Loeb Classical Library 42. Vol. I: Books 1-8. Translated by Frank Justus Miller, revised by G. P. Goold. Cambridge, MA: Harvard University Press.
- Pepin, Ronald E. (2008). The Vatican Mythographers. New York City: Fordham University Press. ISBN 978-0-8232-2892-8.
- Stoneman, Richard (1995). Greek Mythology: An Encyclopedia of Myth and Legend. Diamond Books. ISBN 9780261666528.
- Strabo (1903). W. Falconer, M.A. (ed.). Geographica. Translated by H.C. Hamilton, Esq. London: George Bell & Sons. Online version at Perseus.tufts Library.
- Tovey, Donald Francis (May 31, 2013). The Forms of Music. Read Books Ltd. ISBN 9781473390072.
