= Queen's Landing =

Pier in Chicago, Illinois

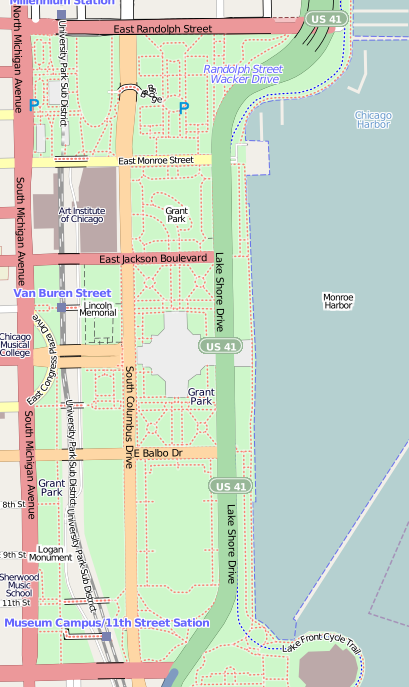
- Queen's Landing is located on the lakefront between Jackson Drive and Balbo Drive
- Type: Working pier
- Carries: Barges
- Spans: Lake Michigan
- Coordinates: 41.8758°N 87.6161°W
- Maintained by: Chicago Department of Transportation

History
- Note: Queen's Landing does not extend into Lake Michigan; instead the pier lies along the lakefront.

Queen's Landing is a concrete pier on the shore of Lake Michigan, east of Lake Shore Drive, across from Buckingham Fountain in Grant Park, Chicago, Illinois, United States. It takes its name from being the site where Queen Elizabeth II and Prince Philip, Duke of Edinburgh disembarked in 1959 during the first visit by a reigning British monarch to Chicago.

== History ==
=== Royal visit ===
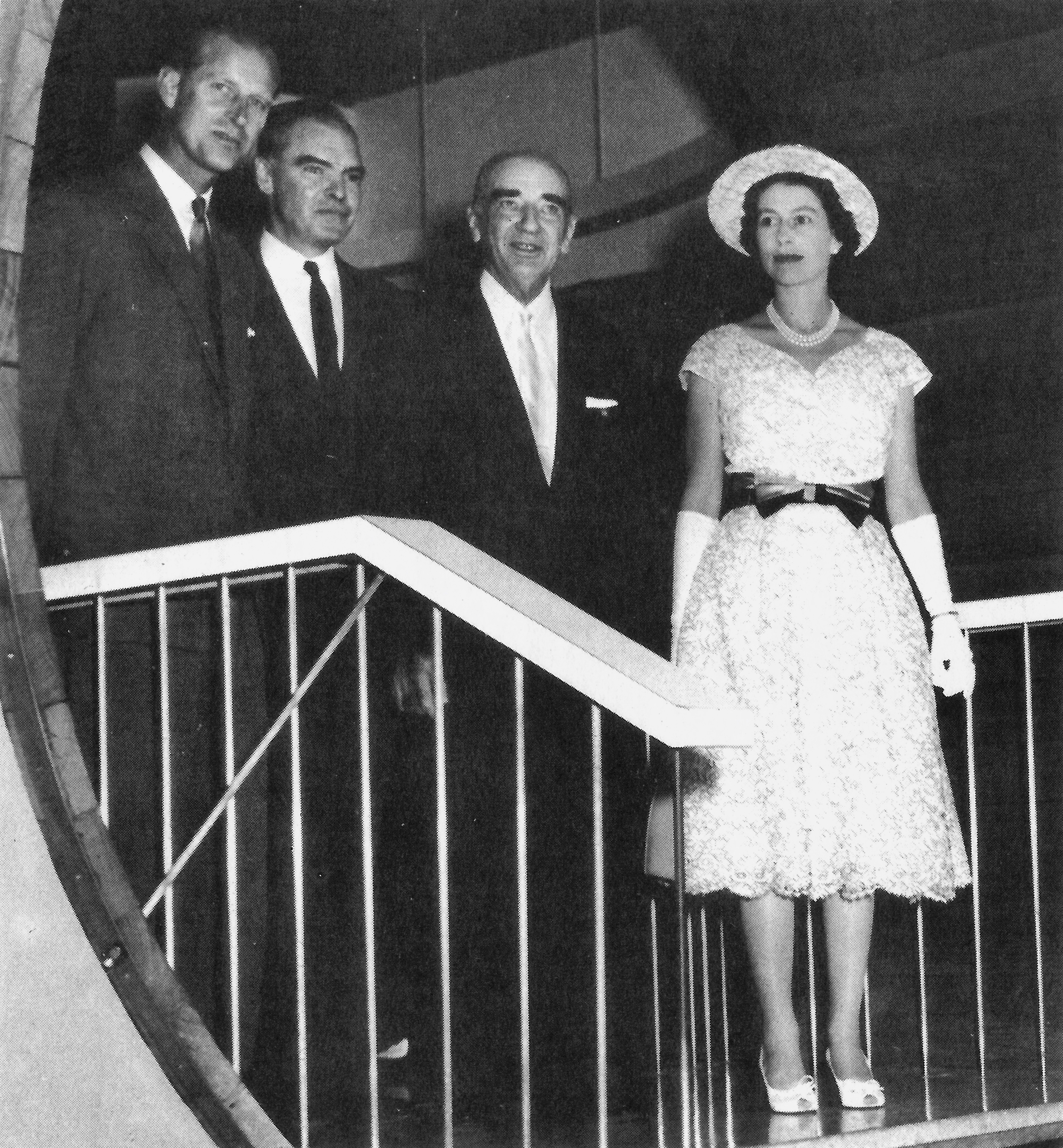
Queen Elizabeth II (far right) and the Duke of Edinburgh (far left) at the Museum of Science and Industry in Chicago on 6 July 1959.

Chicago Mayor Richard J. Daley invited Elizabeth II and Prince Philip to Chicago after the Saint Lawrence Seaway opened in the summer of 1959. The monarch traveled through the seaway on the royal yacht HMY Britannia, which was escorted by seven warships, many other small craft, and two Chinese junks. On Monday, 6 July 1959, more than a million people gathered at the lake shore to see the royal couple. Mayor Daley's special events director, Colonel Jack Reilly, sent over 700 invitations to the reception. Elizabeth gave a short speech after disembarking, and she was greeted by Mayor Daley and his wife, as well as Illinois Governor William Stratton and his wife, Shirley. Elizabeth reviewed some troops that were posted at the lakefront, and the monarch moved on to a thirteen hour tour of the city.

The royal entourage headed west to Michigan Avenue, where the parade turned right and headed north through the Loop and over the Chicago River until reaching Navy Pier. Elizabeth and Philip went to the International Trade Fair, where they walked down the world's longest red carpet, which spanned 2,300 feet. The monarch proceed to visit the Ambassador Hotel for lunch, after which they toured the campus of the University of Chicago as well as the Museum of Science and Industry. The couple then went to the Art Institute of Chicago for a brief visit and attended a reception at the Drake Hotel, where they were greeted by Midwestern governors and mayors. However, the tour experienced one delay: Elizabeth II had to receive an emergency tooth filling. Afterwards, the monarch traveled to a banquet at Conrad Hilton Hotel, which was hosted by Mayor Daley. Almost 1,000 people participated in the dinner service, with attendees including Etta Moten Barnett and John H. Sengstacke. Elizabeth told the diners that "Ever since we landed this morning we have not ceased to be impressed by the massive dignity of your city…We shall carry with us…a memory of the generous hospitality of Chicago which will long warm our hearts.” Later that evening, fireworks were displayed at the lakefront, and Elizabeth told Mayor Daley “This is an unforgettable day – a day I will never forget.”

=== Lake Shore Drive crosswalk ===
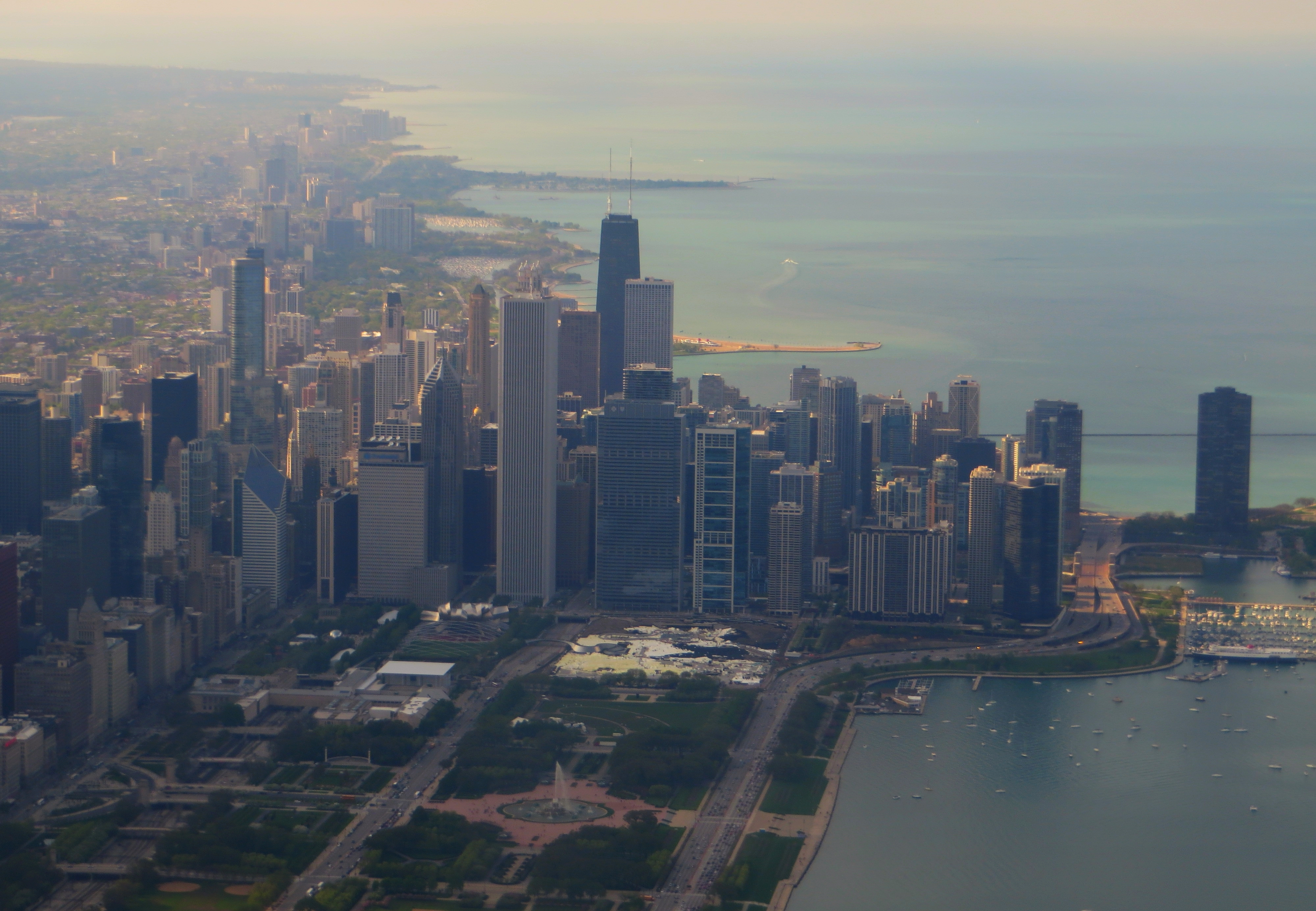
Queen's Landing is visible on the lakefront at the bottom of the image, just to the right of Buckingham Fountain.

In 1988, a crosswalk was created at Lake Shore Drive between Queen's Landing and Buckingham Fountain to facilitate pedestrian traffic. In 2005, this crosswalk was removed, meaning that pedestrians wanting to cross the street towards Queen's Landing had to travel a quarter-mile north or south to Jackson Drive or Balbo Drive respectively if they wanted to use a marked crosswalk. Despite the removal of the crosswalk, pedestrians kept crossing Lake Shore Drive at the same location in order to save time. The crosswalk was eventually restored in 2011 at a cost of $125,000.
