= Sturges =

Sturges is a surname, and may refer to:

== Surname ==
- Adrian Sturges (born 1976), English film producer
- Alberta Sturges (1877–1951), American heiress and, by marriage, 9th Countess of Sandwich
- Betty Sturges, maiden name of Betty Leggett (1857–1931), American socialite
- Edmund Sturges, 16th-century English composer
- Edward Sturges (1920–1997), English rower
- Frederick Sturges (1833–1917), English businessman
- Graeme Sturges (born 1955), Australian politician
- Howard Sturges (1884–1955), American socialite
- John Sturges (disambiguation), various people
- Jonathan Sturges (1740–1819), American lawyer and jurist
- Jonathan Sturges (businessman) (1802–1874), American businessman and arts patron
- Lewis B. Sturges (1763–1844), American politician
- Lilah Sturges (born 1970), American comic writer
- Matthew Sturges (born 1970), American comics author
- Natasha Sturges (born 1975), Australian Olympian windsurfer
- Octavius Sturges (1833–1894), English pediatrician
- Oliver Sturges (1777–1824), American businessman
- Philemon Sturges (1929–2005), American architect
- Stanley Gordon Sturges (1929–2019), American physician and missionary
- Tom Sturges (born 1956), American music executive
- Preston Sturges (1898–1959), American film director and writer
- Ralph W. Sturges (1918–2007), American Mohegan tribal chief
- Robert Sturges (1891–1970), British Royal Marines officer
- Robert B. Sturges, American businessman
- Rush Sturges (born 1985), American kayaker and filmmaker
- Shannon Sturges (born 1968), American actress

== Middle name ==
- Annie Sturges Daniel (1858–1944), American physician
- Kate Sturges Buckingham (1858–1937), American art collector and philanthropist
- Katherine Sturges Dodge (1890–1979), American writer and illustrator
- Peter Sturges Ruckman (1921–2016), American Baptist author
- Thomas Sturges Jackson (1842–1934), British Royal Navy officer
- Thomas Sturges Watson (born 1949), American golfer
- William Sturges Bourne (1769–1845), British politician

== See also ==
- Sturges, Missouri
- Sturges' formula in Histogram
- Sturgis (surname), alternative spelling
- Sturgess
