= Buckingham Fountain =

- U.S. Historic district – Contributing property
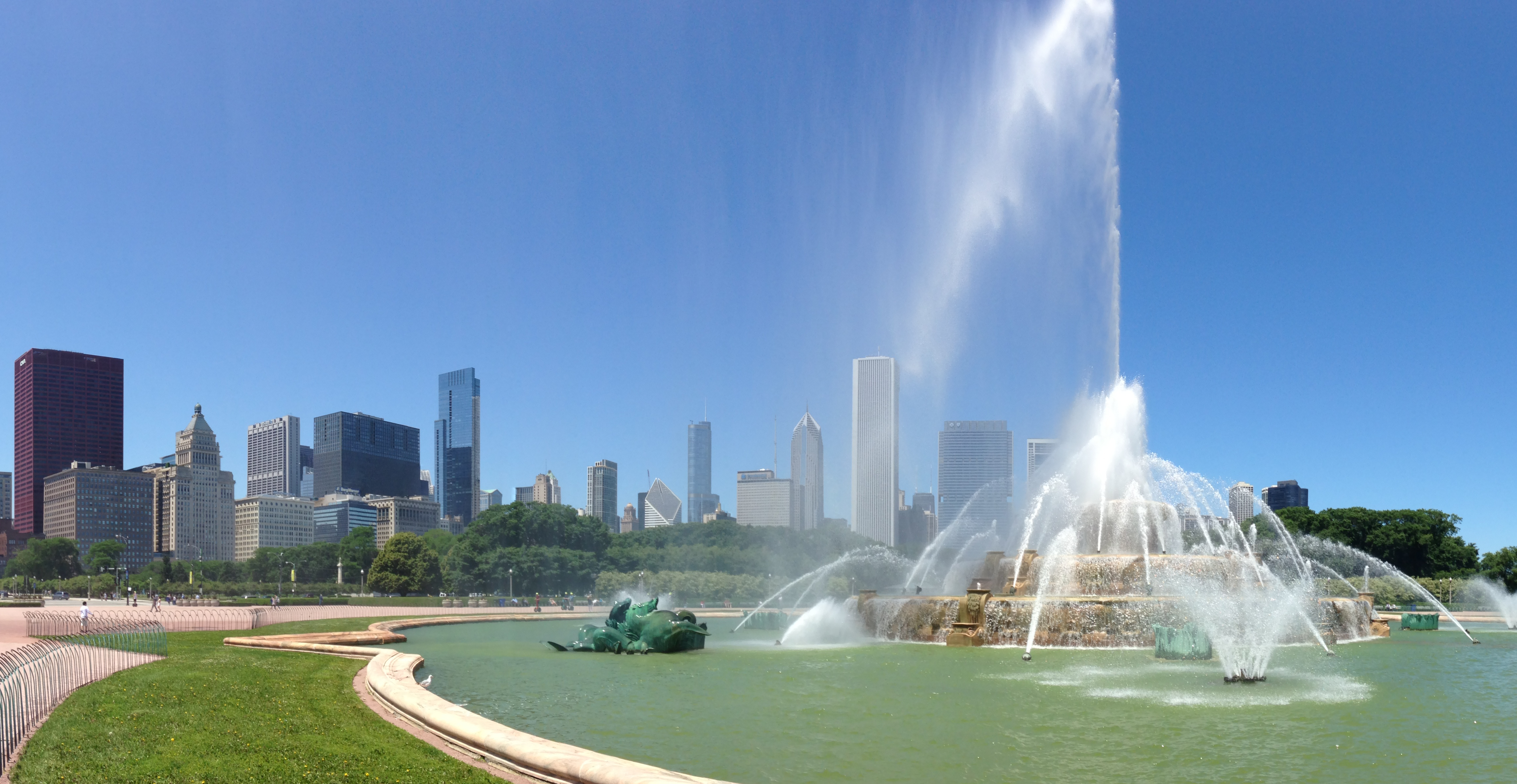
- Buckingham Fountain in Grant Park

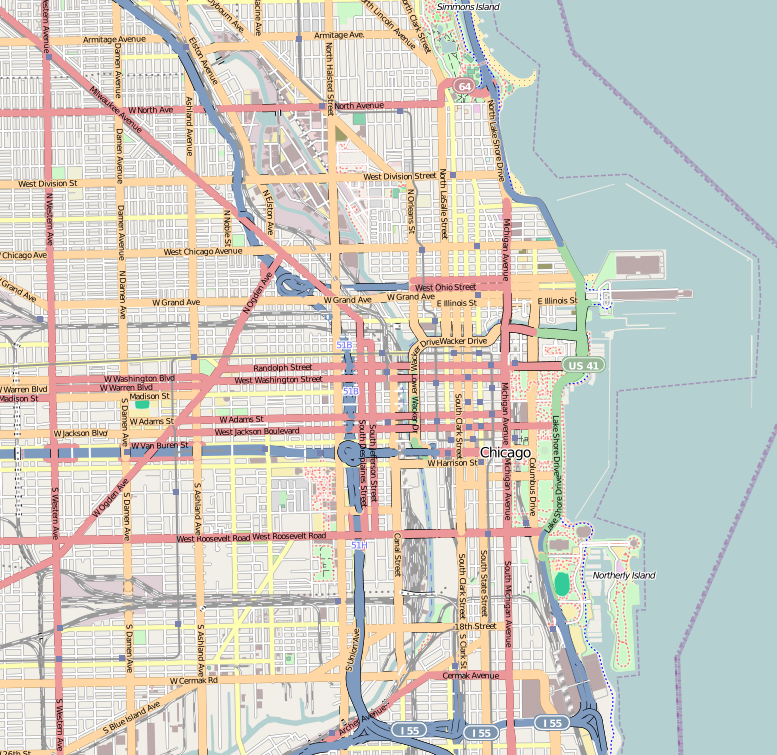
- Location within Central Chicago Location within Illinois Location within the United States
- Location: Chicago
- Coordinates: 41°52′33″N 87°37′08″W
- Area: Downtown Chicago
- Built: 1927; 99 years ago
- Architect: Bennett, Edward H.; Lambert, Jacques H.; Loyau, Marcel Francois
- Architectural style: Beaux Arts, Art Decomo
- Part of: Grant Park (ID92001075)
- Added to NRHP: July 21, 1993

Buckingham Fountain is a Chicago Landmark in the center of Grant Park, between Queen's Landing and the end of Ida B. Wells Drive. Dedicated in 1927 and donated to the city by philanthropist Kate S. Buckingham, it is one of the largest fountains in the world. Built in a rococo wedding cake style and inspired by the Latona Fountain at the Palace of Versailles, its design allegorically represents nearby Lake Michigan. The fountain operates generally from mid-April to mid-October, with regular water-jet displays and evening colored-light shows. During the winter, the fountain is decorated with festival lights.

== History ==
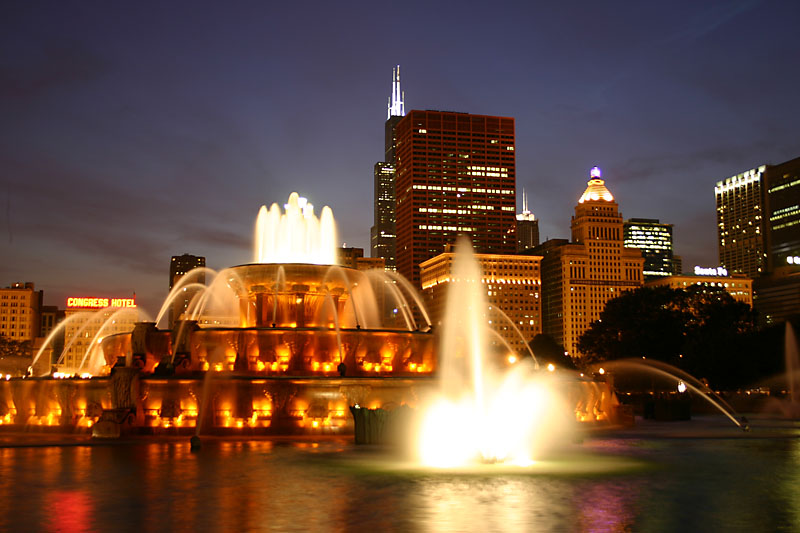
Buckingham Fountain

The fountain area has been called Chicago's front door, since it is located in the center of Grant Park, the city's front yard near the intersection of Columbus Drive and Ida B. Wells Drive. The fountain itself represents Lake Michigan, with four sets of sea horses (two per set) symbolizing the four states—Illinois, Wisconsin, Michigan and Indiana—that border the lake. The fountain was designed by beaux arts architect Edward H. Bennett. The statues were created by the French sculptor Marcel F. Loyau. The design of the fountain was inspired by the Bassin de Latone and modeled after Latona Fountain at Versailles.

The fountain was donated to the city by Kate Sturges Buckingham in memory of her brother, Clarence Buckingham, and was constructed at a cost of $750,000 ($13.9 million in 2025). The fountain's official name is the Clarence Buckingham Memorial Fountain. Kate Buckingham also established the Buckingham Fountain Endowment Fund with an initial investment of $300,000 to pay for maintenance. Buckingham Fountain was dedicated on August 26, 1927.

In August 2016, in a partnership with the City of Chicago, the Chicago Parks District and Everywhere Wireless, the Buckingham Fountain viewing area joined many Chicago beaches and the Museum Campus in providing free Wi-Fi to visitors.

== Operation ==
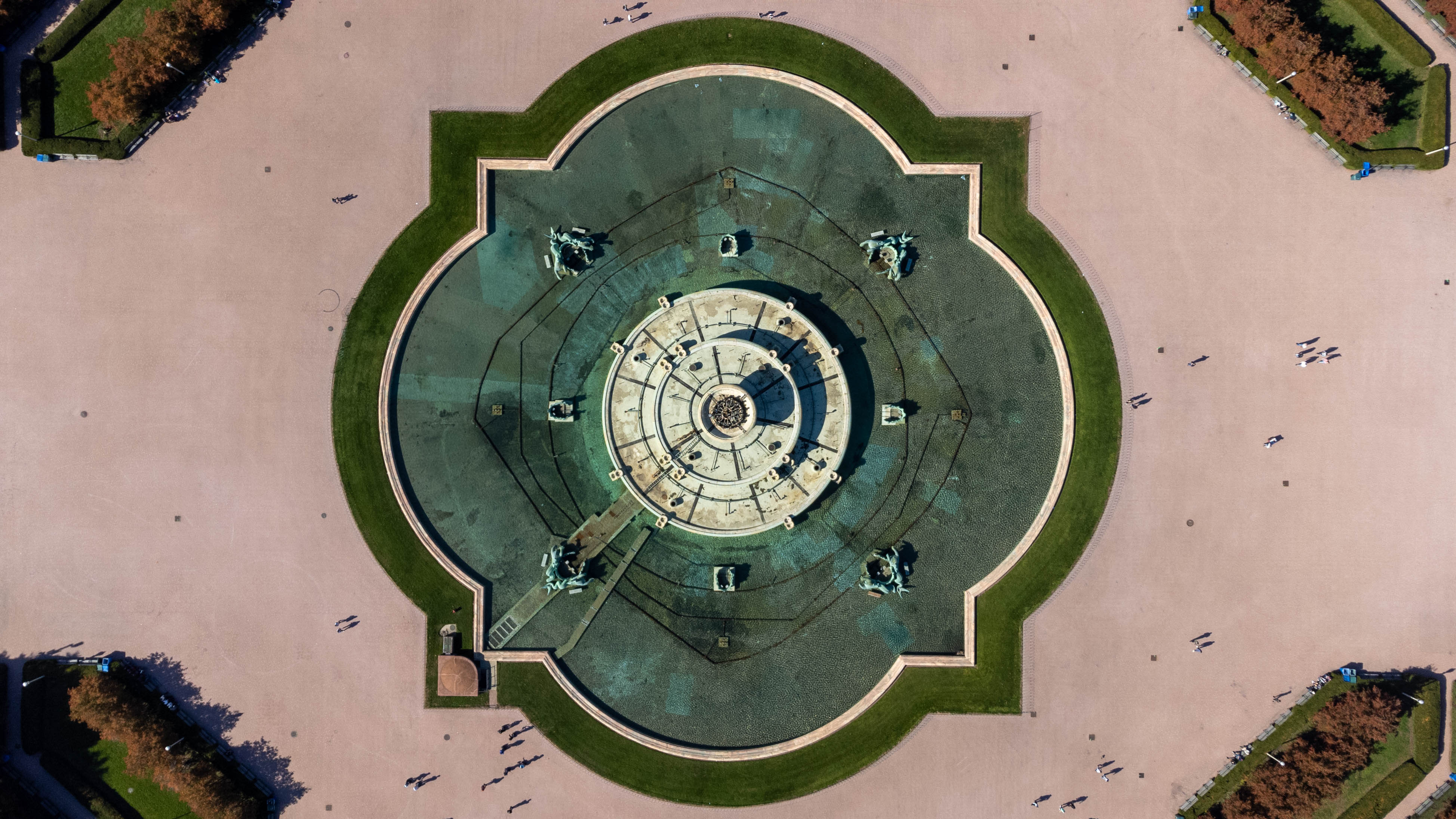
The fountain while turned off during the fall.

Many tourists and Chicagoans visit the fountain each year. The fountain operates from 8:00 a.m. to 11:00 p.m. daily, typically from early May through mid-October, depending on weather. Water shows occur every hour on-the-hour and last 20 minutes. During shows, the center jet shoots up vertically to 150 feet (46 m), and after dusk shows are choreographed with lights and music. The last show begins at 10:00 p.m. nightly.

The fountain is constructed of Georgia pink marble and contains 1.5 million U.S. gallons (5,700,000 L) of water. During a display, more than 14,000 U.S. gallons per minute (0.88 m^{3}/s) are pushed through its 193 jets. The bottom pool of the fountain is 280 ft (85 m) in diameter, the lower basin is 103 ft (31 m), the middle basin is 60 ft (18 m) and the upper basin is 24 ft (7.3 m). The lip of the upper basin is 25 ft (7.6 m) above the water in the lower basin.

The fountain's pumps are controlled by a Honeywell computer which was previously located in Atlanta, Georgia, until the 1994 renovation when it was moved to the pump house of the fountain. The fountain's security system is monitored from Arlington Heights (a Chicago suburb).

== Renovations ==
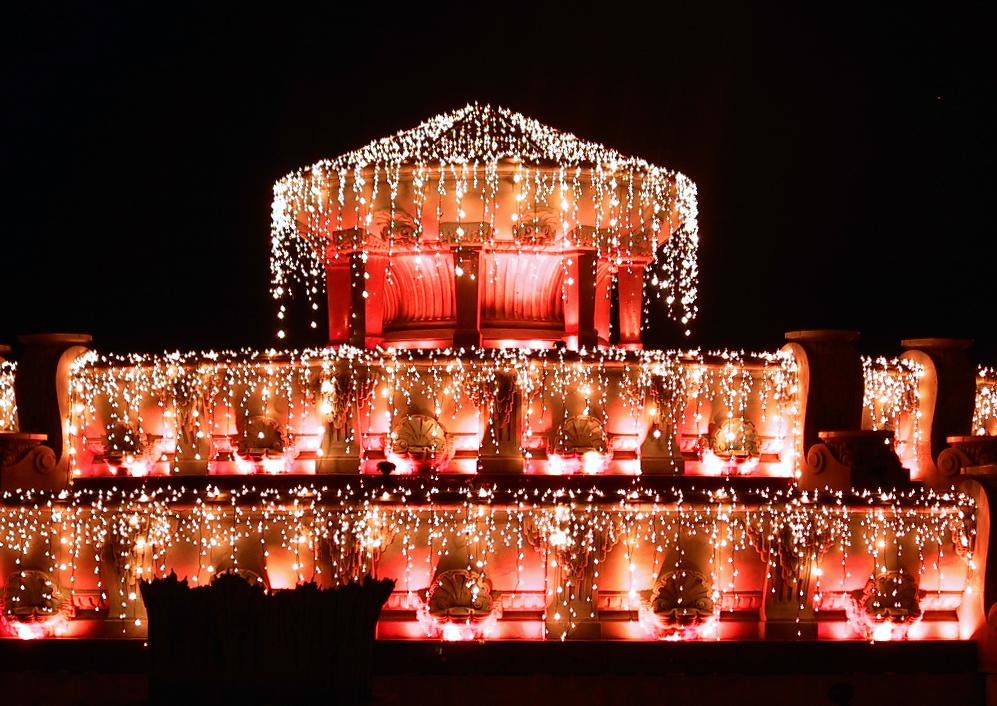
Fountain in winter

In 1994, the fountain received a $2.8 million restoration to its three smallest basins which developed leaks due to Chicago's harsh winters.

The latest renovation project on Buckingham Fountain began in September 2008. This three-phase project modernized aging internal systems in the fountain and restored deteriorated features. Funding was a combination from the Buckingham endowment, city and park district funds and a grant from the Lollapalooza music festival which is held annually near the fountain.

Phase I was dedicated April 3, 2009. This phase included permeable pavers to surround the fountain. This replaced the crushed stone that was used since the fountain was constructed. The pavers make a safer and smoother surface and complies with the Americans with Disabilities Act of 1990.

Phase II was planned to begin in the winter of 2009. This phase included the demolition of the fountain table, installation of extensive underdrainage system, new landscaping, site lighting, signs, site furnishings, sewer system, selective demolition within or adjacent to the fountain's outer basin, repairs of some existing cast-in-place concrete elements and installation of new cast-in-place elements. Work was not completed due to lack of funds and the Chicago Park District has not announced when it expects to finish this phase.

Phase III updates have not been designed and won't begin until Phase II is completed. This phase will include the restoration of Buckingham Fountain and fountain table, the construction of a new equipment room with selective demolition, structural construction and repair, masonry restoration and repair, mechanical and electrical work, bronze restoration and repair and installation of site improvements and amenities.

== In popular culture ==
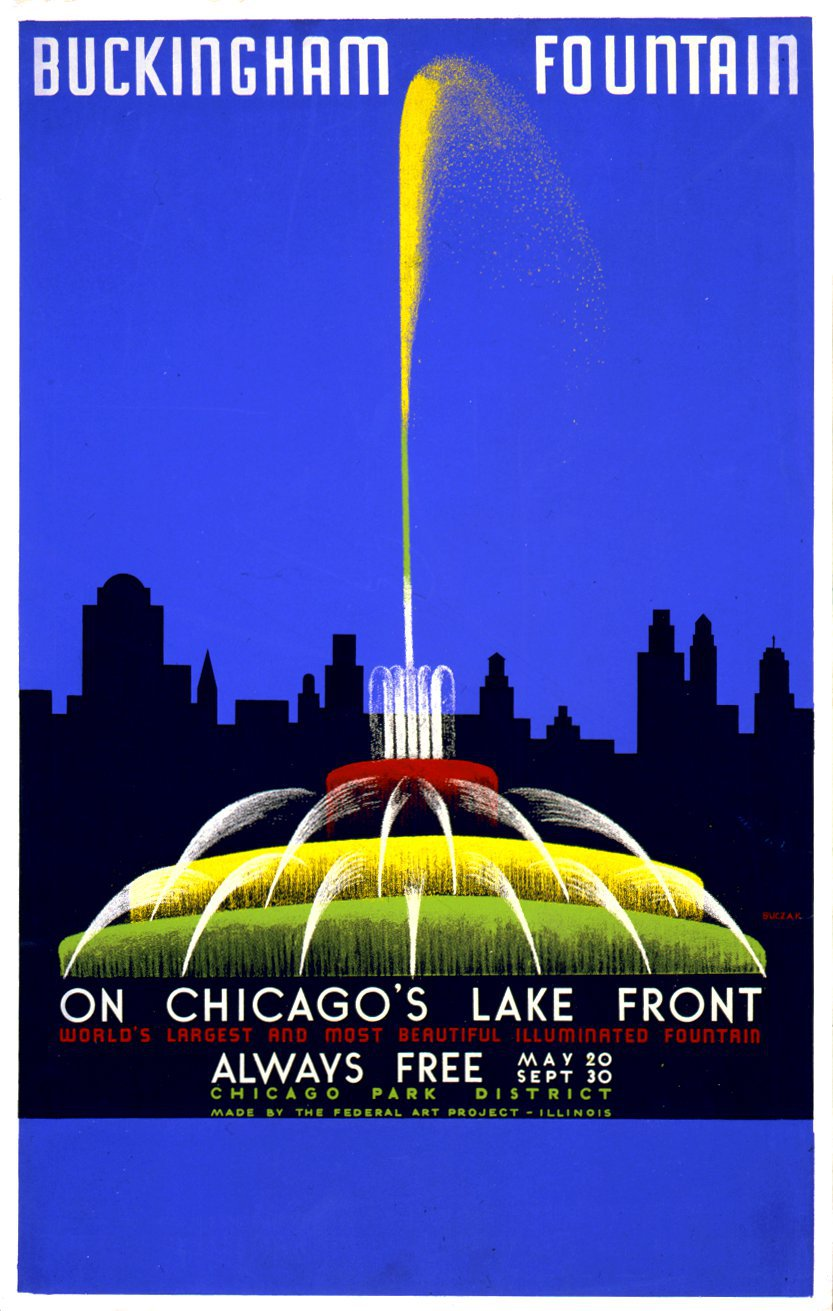
Buckingham Fountain on a 1939 Works Progress Administration poster

=== Entertainment ===
Buckingham Fountain was featured in the title sequences of TV shows Married... with Children and Crime Story.

The fountain was the starting point for the television show The Amazing Race 6 in 2004 and was featured in a task 13 years later on The Amazing Race 29.

Buckingham Fountain features in the 1949 film noir film Undertow, as the protagonist's meeting place.

The song Spider-Man Dick by Cupcakke mentions Buckingham Fountain.

=== Confusion with Route 66 ===
Buckingham Fountain is often incorrectly identified as the eastern terminus of historic U.S. Route 66 (the road west to Southern California), but, although near, it was not the end point of that historic route. The original eastern terminus was nearby at the intersection of Jackson Boulevard and Michigan Avenue in downtown Chicago. In a later alignment, the terminus was moved east several blocks through Grant Park to the intersection with Lake Shore Drive after the latter was designated as U.S. Route 41. It remained there until the eastern terminus of Interstate 55 was completed at Lake Shore Drive, and then that also became the eastern terminus of Route 66 until I-55 completely replaced the route in Illinois and U.S. 66 was decommissioned (in 1985). Nevertheless, many people still associate Buckingham Fountain with the start of Route 66, even though it had not been built yet when the route opened on November 11, 1926 — whereas the Fountain of the Great Lakes in the South Garden of the Art Institute of Chicago, which has been near the intersection of Jackson and Michigan since 1913, actually preceded Route 66 by 13 years and Buckingham Fountain by 14 years. Because Jackson is now a one way street going east, the historic commemorative signs for Route 66 now show "End" at Jackson near Michigan, but "Begin" is moved one block north to Adams Street (in front of the Art Institute), which is a one-way going west.

== Gallery ==
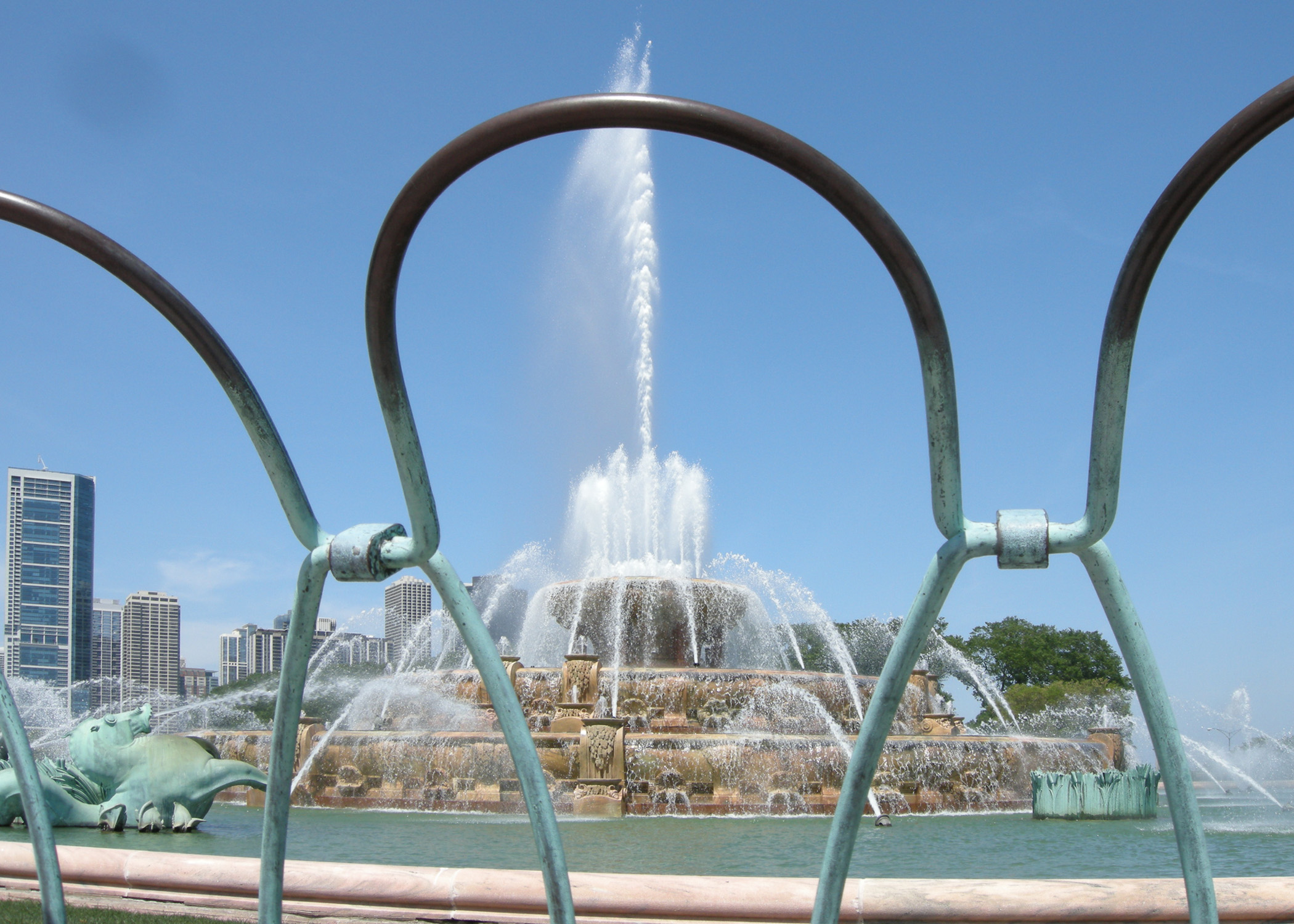
Through the fence, 2009

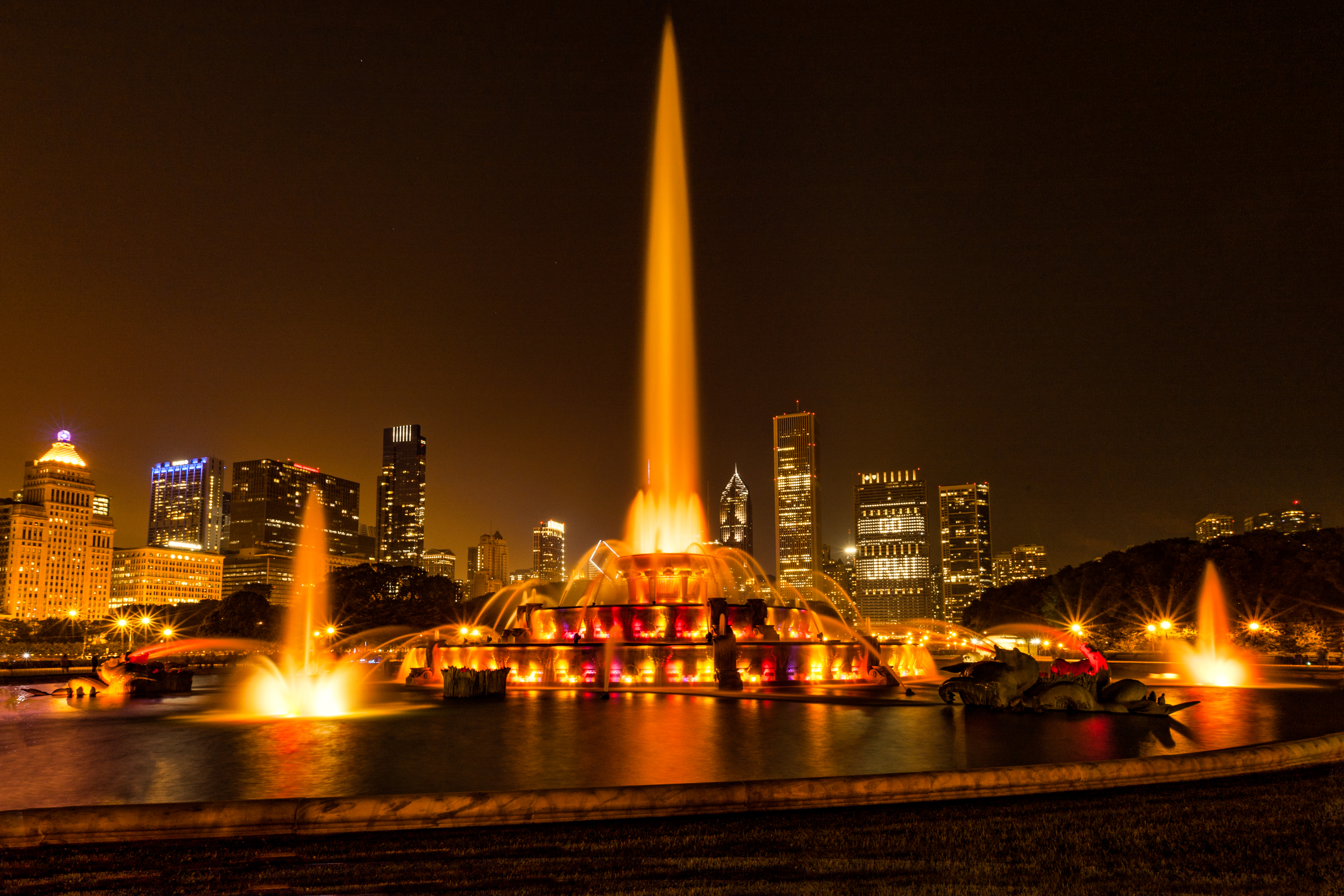
Night view, 2014

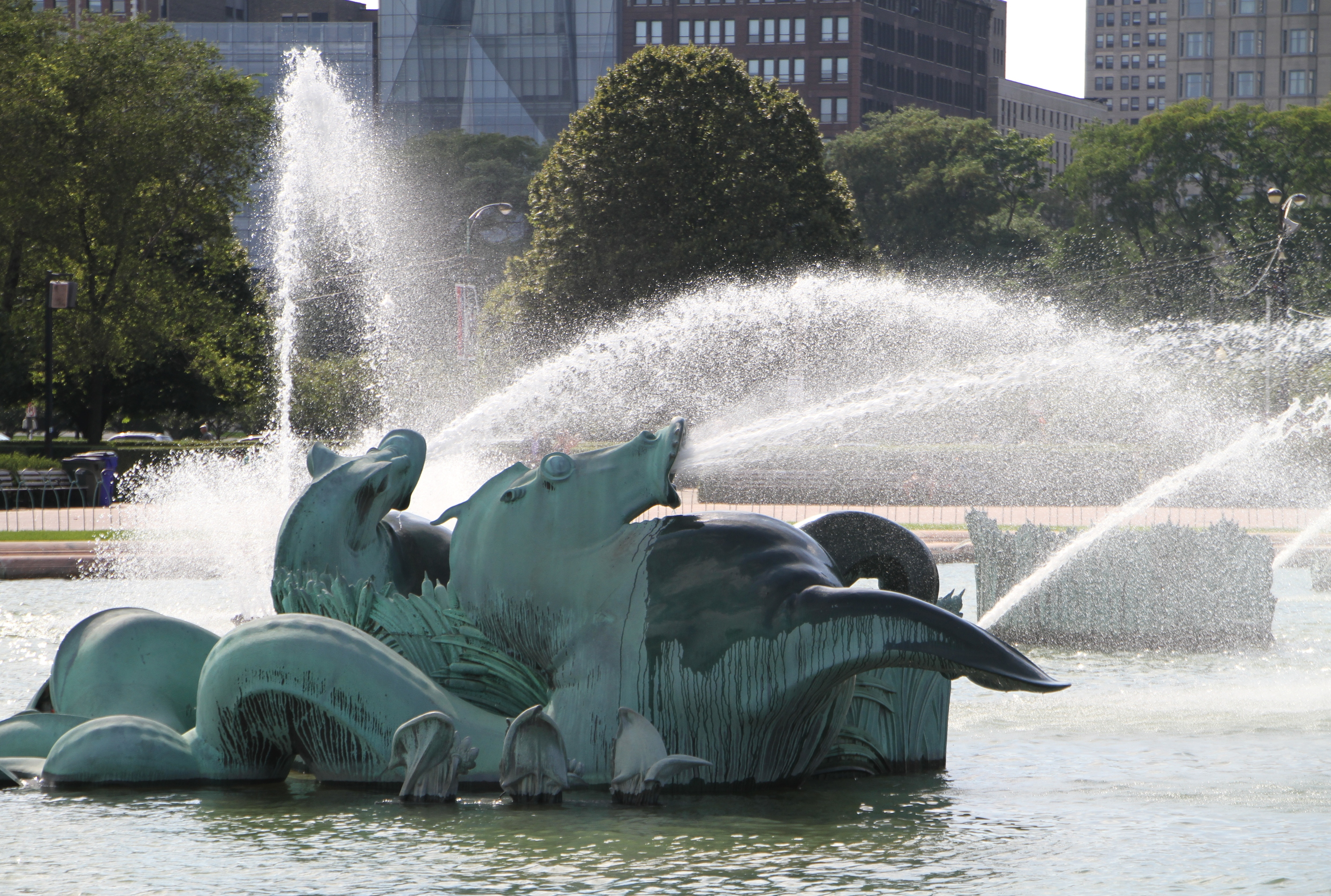
Sea serpent, 2014

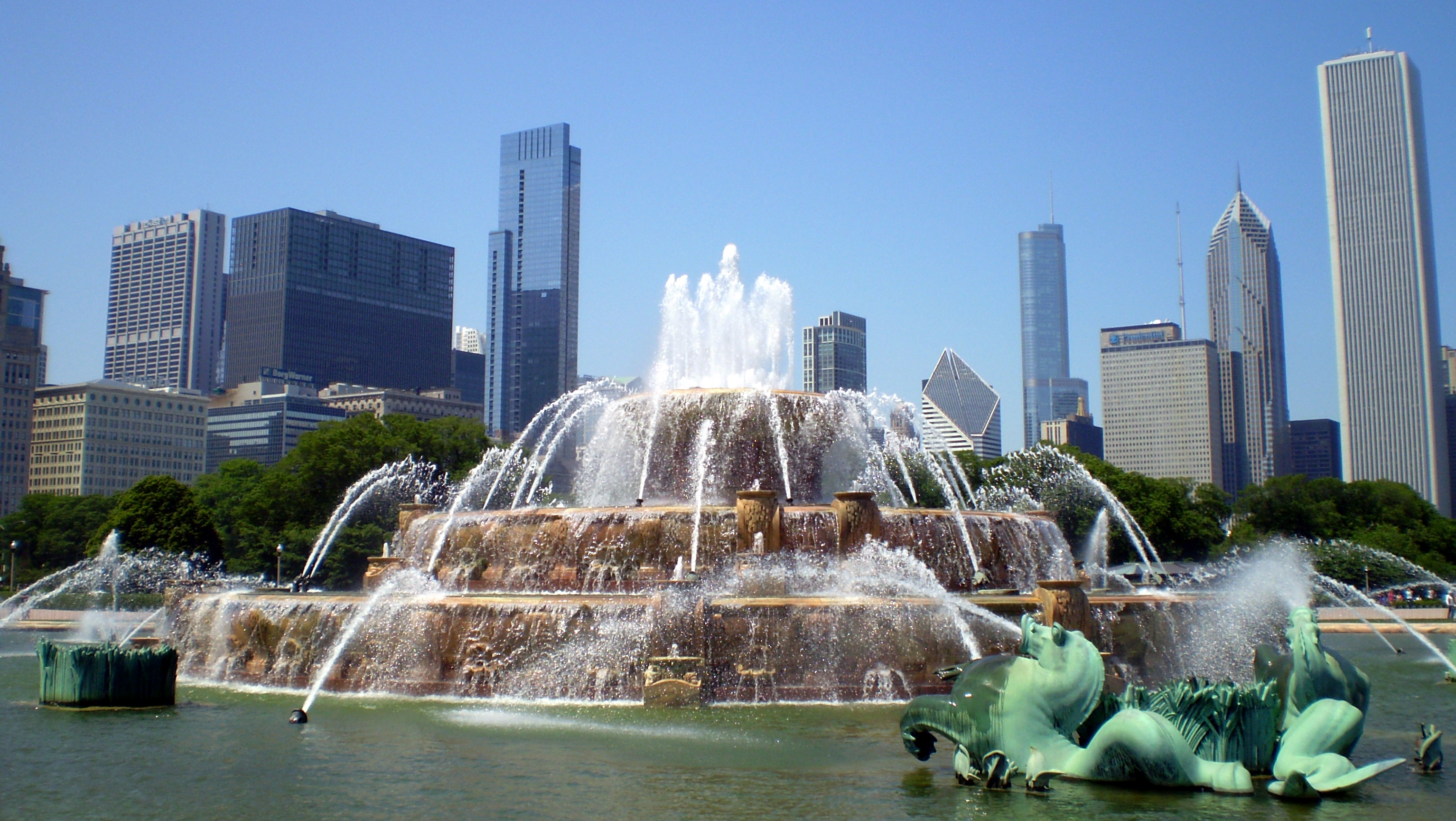
Skyline and serpent, 2010

== See also ==
- History of fountains in the United States
