= Stratfield Turgis =

Village and parish in Hampshire, England

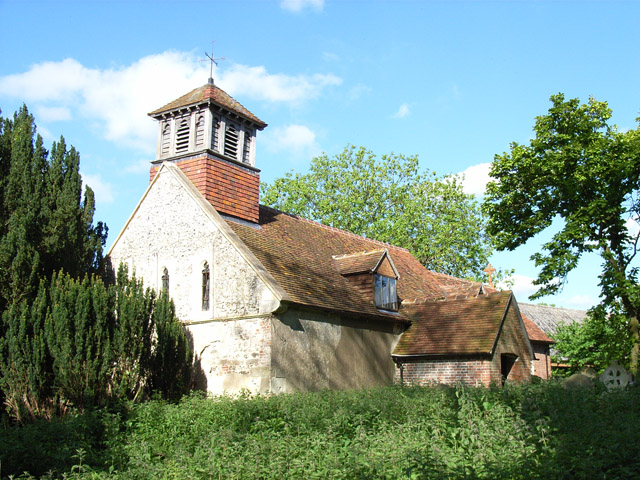
- The deconsecrated All Saints' Church, Stratfield Turgis

- Location within Hampshire
- Population: 91 (2021 census)
- OS grid reference: SU695598
- Civil parish: Stratfield Turgis
- District: Basingstoke and Deane
- Shire county: Hampshire
- Region: South East
- Country: England
- Sovereign state: United Kingdom
- Post town: HOOK
- Postcode district: RG27
- Dialling code: 01256
- Police: Hampshire and Isle of Wight
- Fire: Hampshire and Isle of Wight
- Ambulance: South Central
- UK Parliament: North East Hampshire
- Website: Stratfield Turgis Parish Meeting

Stratfield Turgis is a village and civil parish in the Basingstoke and Deane district, in the north-east of the county of Hampshire, England. The parish includes the hamlet of Spanish Green. In 2021 the parish had a population of 91.

== History ==
The name derives from its origins on open land (Old English feld) by the Roman road (Old English stræt) from Silchester to London, and the Turgis family, who held the manor of the de Ports and St. Johns from as early as 1270.

== Governance ==
The village is part of the civil parish of Stratfield Turgis, and is part of the Pamber and Silchester ward of Basingstoke and Deane borough council. The borough council is a Non-metropolitan district of Hampshire County Council.

== Geography ==
The parish is located on the main A33 between Reading and Basingstoke at 51°20′N 1°0′W. It comprises the hamlets of Spanish Green and Turgis Green together with Stratfield Turgis itself and surrounding outlying farms.

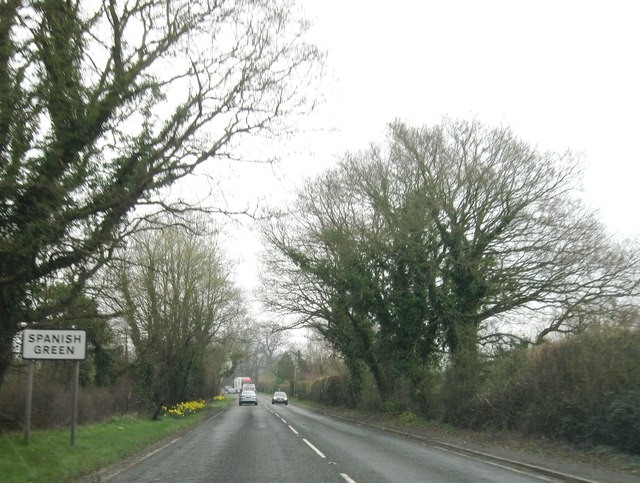
Entering Spanish Green

== Sport and leisure ==
Stratfield Turgis & Hartley Wespall Cricket Club play at Turgis Green.

== Education ==
- Daneshill School is a preparatory school for boys and girls aged 3 to 13 years old. The school was founded in 1950 in Sherborne St John, under the name of St Salvator's. It moved to the Lutyens-designed Daneshill House in 1954, when it was renamed Daneshill School. In 1973 it moved to Dogmersfield Park, near Odiham; and in 1979 to "Bylands", Stratfield Turgis, its current home.
