= Kate Sturges Buckingham =

American art collector and philanthropist (1858–1937)

- Born: August 3, 1858; Zanesville, Ohio, US
- Died: December 14, 1937 (aged 79); Chicago, Illinois, US
- Known for: Art collector, philanthropist

Kate Sturges Buckingham (1858–1937) was an American art collector and philanthropist. She collected medieval sculpture, tapestries, and decorative arts. She is best known for her gifts to the city of Chicago, specifically the Buckingham Fountain in Grant Park, a statue honoring Alexander Hamilton in Lincoln Park, and her family's art collection to the Art Institute of Chicago.

== Life ==
Buckingham was born in Zanesville, Ohio, to a wealthy family on August 3, 1858. She was the daughter of Ebenezer Buckingham and Lucy Sturges Buckingham. She survived her brother, Clarence, who died in 1913 and her sister, Lucy Maud, who died in 1920. After the death of her siblings Buckingham became the sole heir of the family grain elevator fortune. This provided her the means to continue collecting art, and to fund public arts projects.

== The Buckingham siblings and the Art Institute of Chicago ==
Clarence Buckingham had been a governing member and a trustee of the Art Institute. Kate was influenced by his association with the institution. After Lucy Maud's death, Kate donated Lucy Maud's collection of over 400 Chinese ritual bronzes. In 1924 Kate donated her own collection of medieval sculpture, tapestries, and decorative arts and in 1925 she donated Clarence's collection of thousands of Japanese prints. The Art Institute recognizes the importance of these donations and endowments by naming their planned giving program the Buckingham Society.

== Buckingham and public art ==
In 1924 Buckingham was inspired by the fountains of Versailles to commission a fountain in Grant Park to honor her brother Clarence. This was called Buckingham Fountain, built at a cost of $750,000, and was dedicated on August 26, 1927. She also commissioned the Alexander Hamilton monument in Lincoln Park in Chicago.

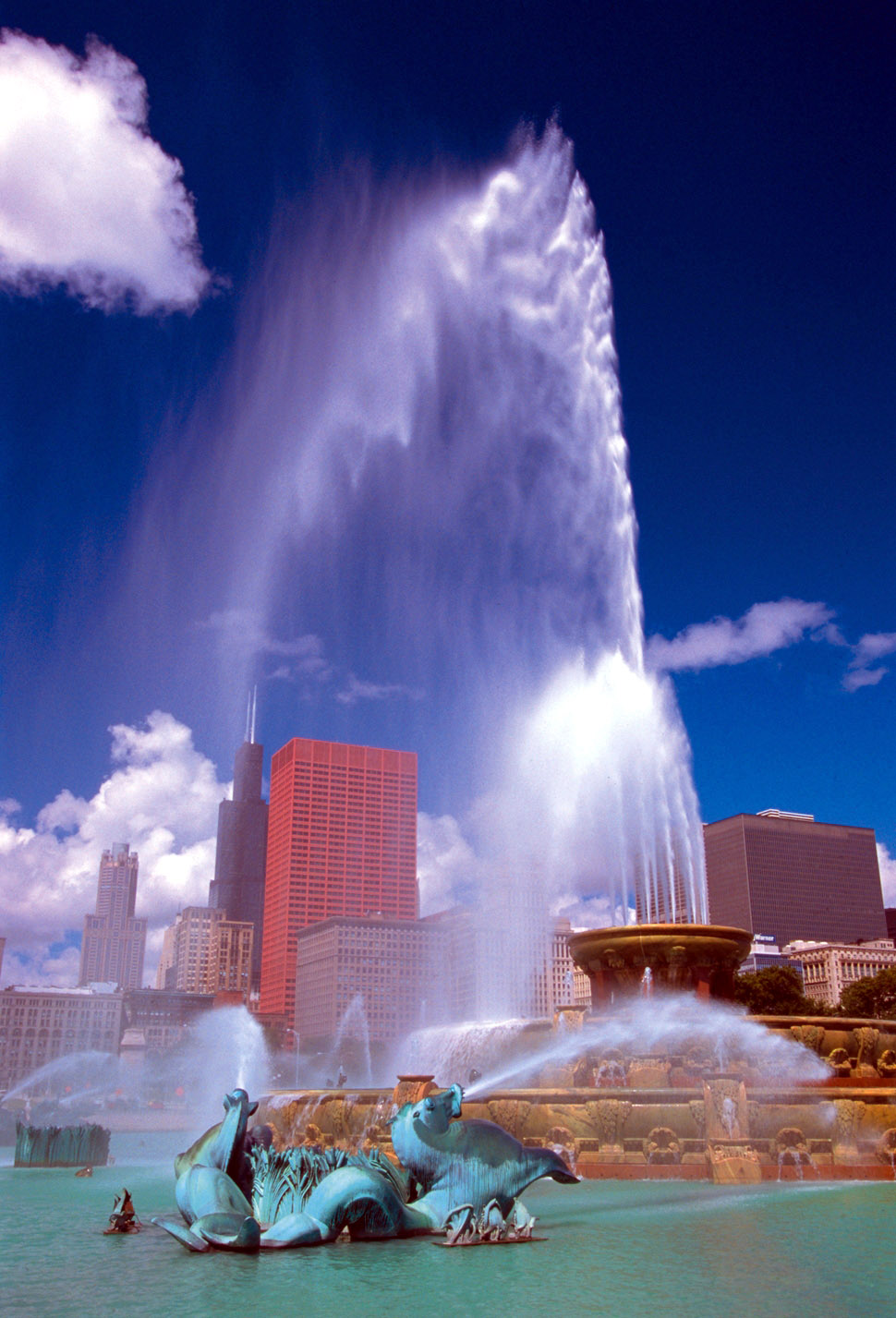
Buckingham Fountain in Grant Park

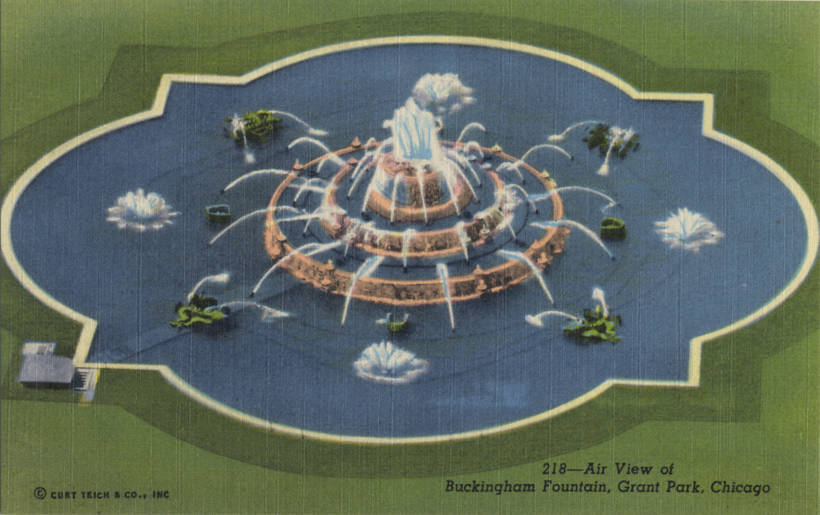
Postcard image of Buckingham Fountain

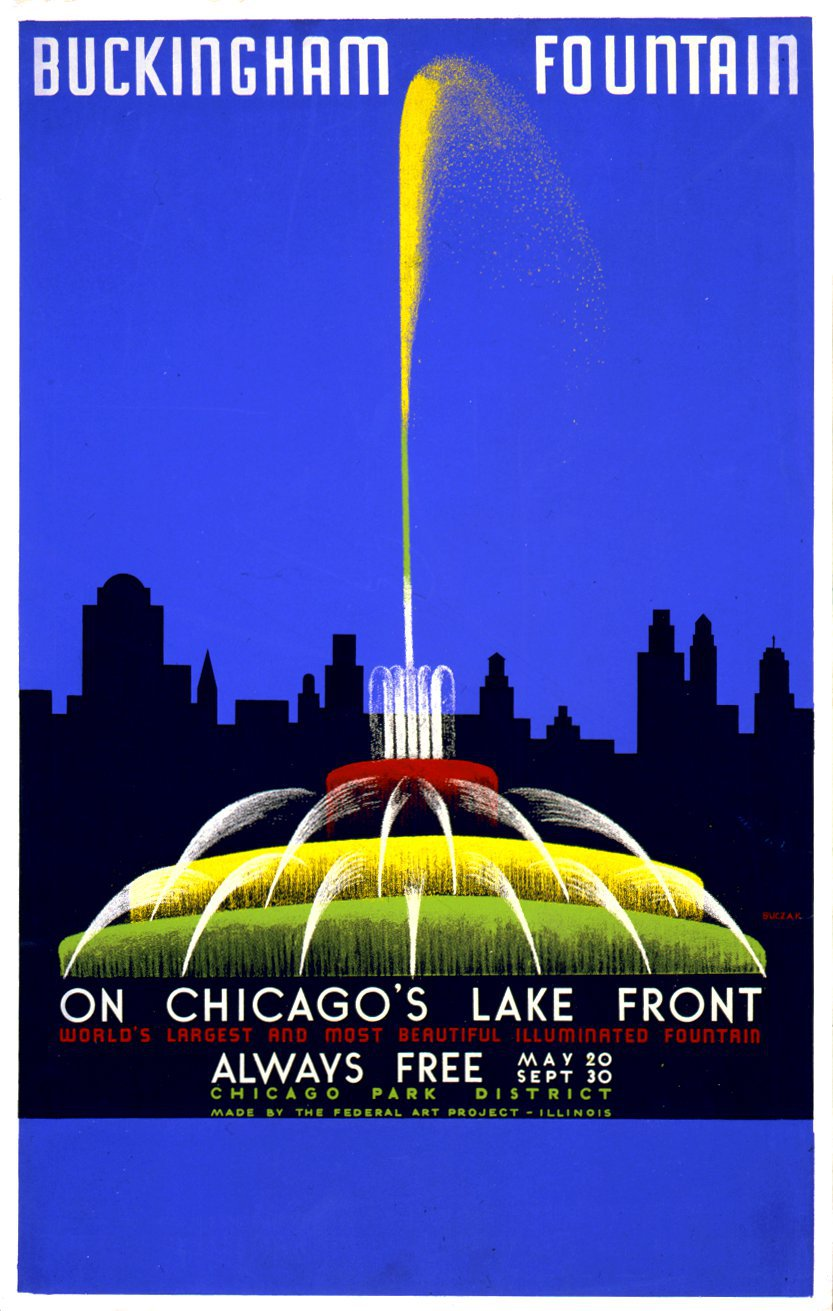
WPA poster promoting Buckingham Fountain, 1939

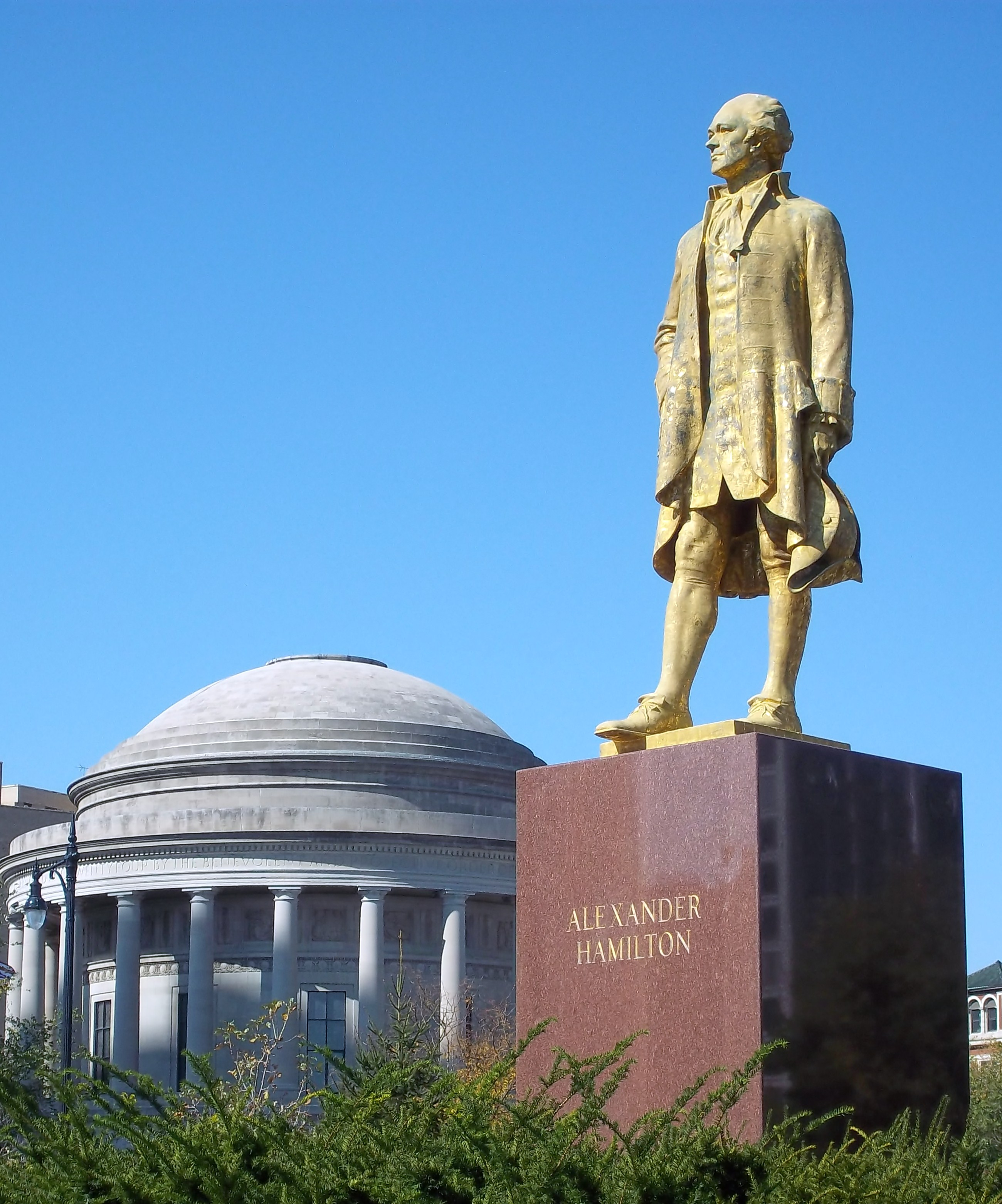
Alexander Hamilton monument in Lincoln Park

== Personal life ==
Buckingham never married. She shunned attention and requested that her name be removed from the Social Register. All the donations she made to the Art Institute of Chicago were made in the names of her dead siblings. Buckingham died on December 14, 1937, in Chicago.
