= Turgis Green =

Hamlet in Hampshire, England

Coordinates: 51.3276°N 1.0022°W

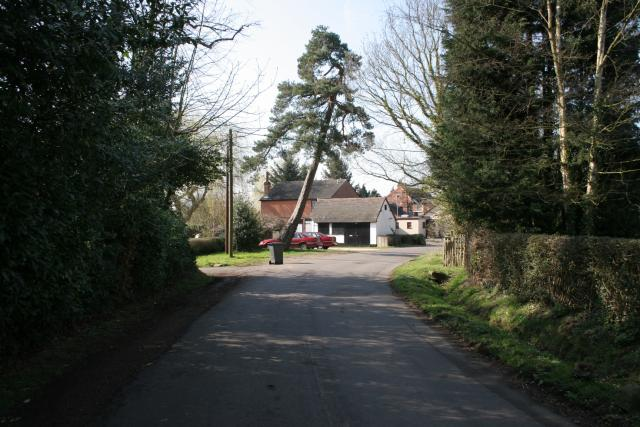

- Location within Hampshire
- OS grid reference: SU6951359250
- Civil parish: Stratfield Turgis
- District: Basingstoke and Deane
- Shire county: Hampshire
- Region: South East
- Country: England
- Sovereign state: United Kingdom
- Post town: Hook
- Postcode district: RG27
- Dialling code: 01256
- Police: Hampshire and Isle of Wight
- Fire: Hampshire and Isle of Wight
- Ambulance: South Central
- UK Parliament: Basingstoke
- Website: Stratfield Turgis Parish Meeting

Turgis Green is a hamlet in the English county of Hampshire. It is split between the civil parishes of Hartley Wespall and Stratfield Turgis. It contains six Grade II listed buildings and a Grade II listed milestone (on the A33).

== Governance ==
The hamlet of Turgis Green lies on the border of the civil parishes of Stratfield Turgis and Hartley Wespall with several houses in either parish. It is part of the Pamber and Silchester ward of Basingstoke and Deane borough council. The borough council is a Non-metropolitan district of Hampshire County Council.

== Geography ==
Turgis Green is located nine miles south of the large town of Reading, and six miles north of Basingstoke.

Nearby towns and cities: Basingstoke, Reading

== Transportation ==
The hamlet is situated on the northern section of the busy A33 road, which splits it north to south. It is not served by any public transport.

== History ==
The hamlet is named for the Turgis family that owned land locally in the thirteenth century. Turgis Green was inclosed in 1866 as a result of the Inclosure Act 1845 (8 & 9 Vict. c. 118), which permitted landlords to enclose open fields and common land and deny local people their historic rights to graze on these area, as well as wood gathering and water rights. Late in the eighteenth century it was proposed to build a cut (canal branch) from the Basingstoke Canal to Turgis Green but the proposal never came to fruition.

== Sport and leisure ==
The hamlet includes a cricket pitch, home of the Stratfield Turgis & Hartley Wespall Cricket Club, and small children's playground.

== Religious Sites ==
Turgis Green is served by the church of St. Mary the Blessed Virgin, about a mile from the hamlet and close to the hamlet of Hartley Wespall.
