= John Sturgess =

British artist

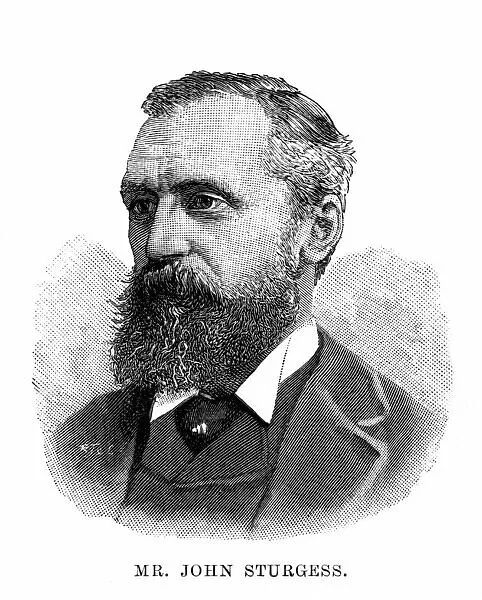
John Sturgess, artist and illustrator

John Sturgess (fl. 1864–1903) was a hunting and racing artist and lithographer who worked mainly for the Illustrated London News between 1875 and 1885, and also exhibited widely in the London galleries, in particular at the Royal Society of British Artists and also at the Royal Hibernian Society in Dublin. He was known for being an accomplished illustrator of books and magazines, but is probably best remembered for his portrait of "Blair Athol", the winner of the Derby in 1864.

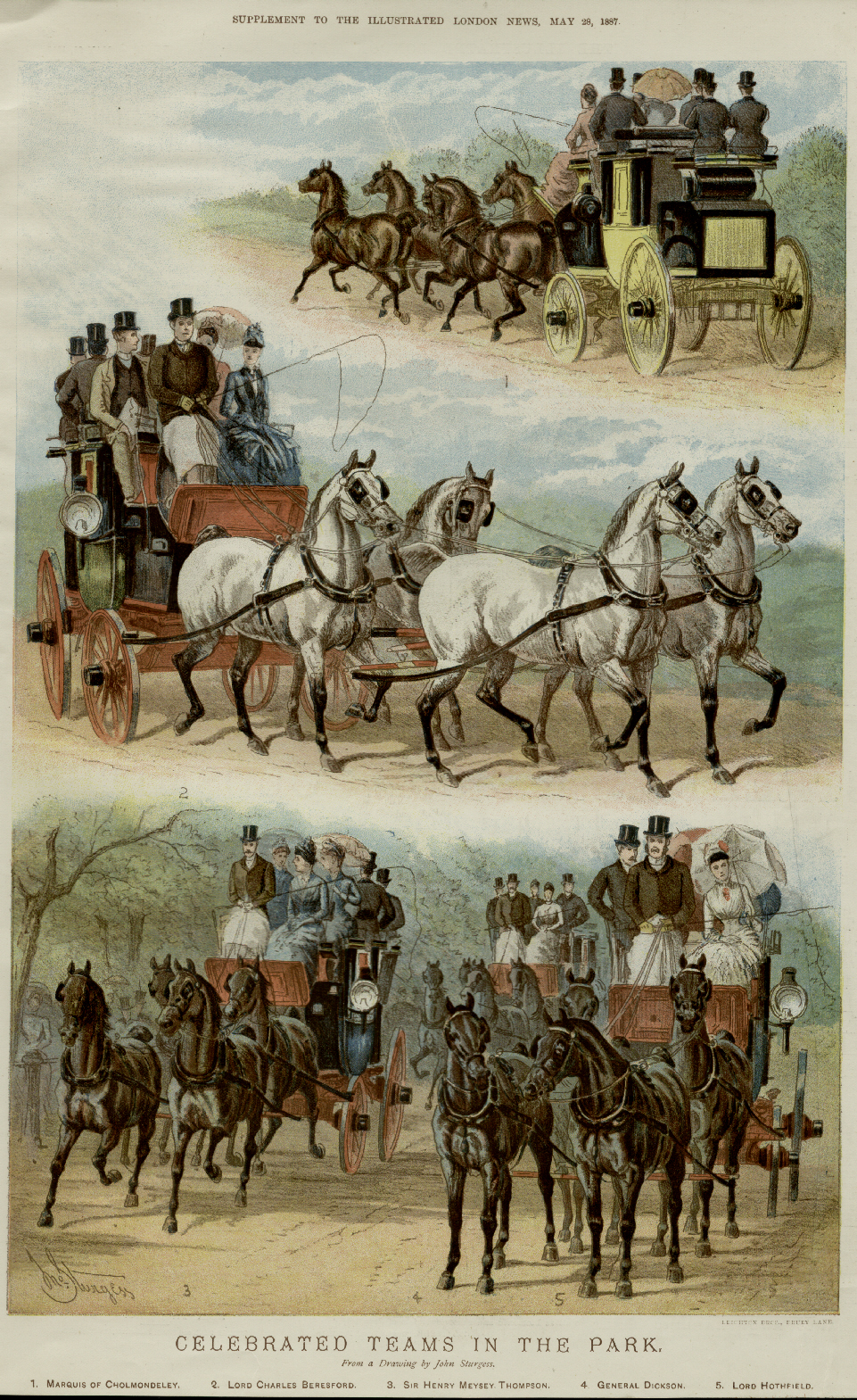
"Celebrated Teams in the Park" from Illustrated London News of 28 May 1887

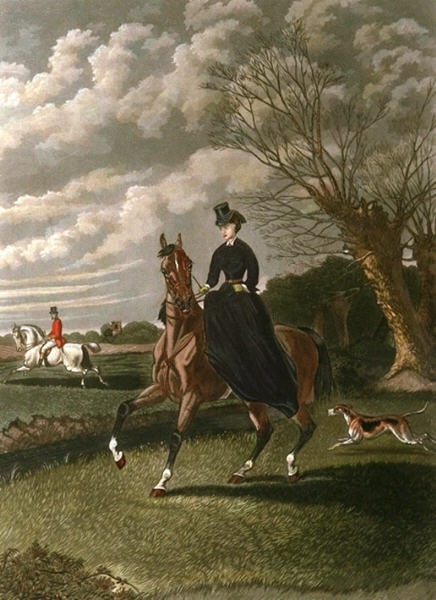
"Not this Time" : John Sturgess, engraved by C & Son Hunt
