= Jonathan Sturges House =

Historic house in Connecticut, United States

- U.S. National Register of Historic Places
- U.S. National Historic Landmark
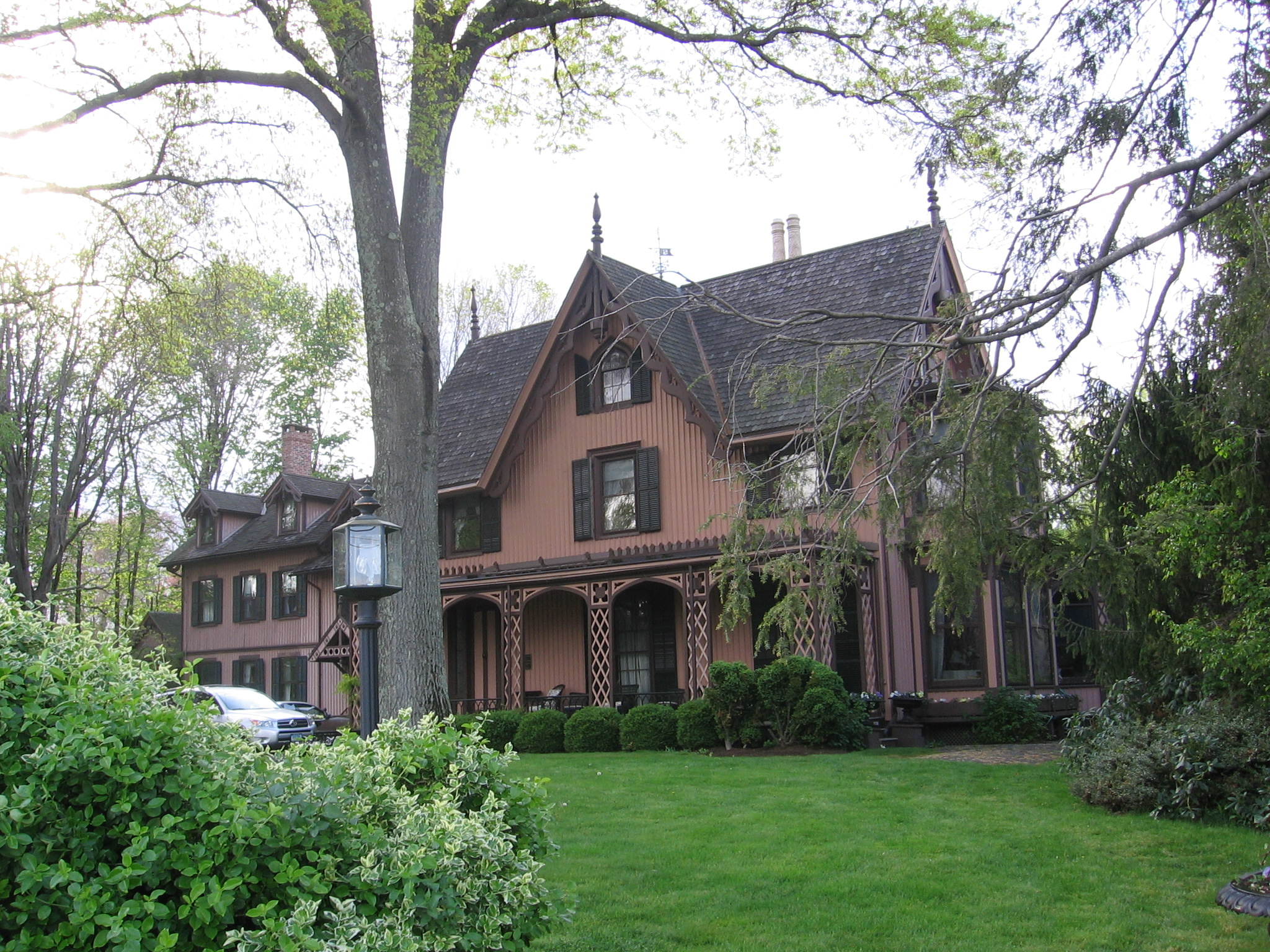
- House seen from Mill Plain Green, April 25, 2012

- Location within Connecticut Location within the United States
- Location: 449 Mill Plain Road, Fairfield, Connecticut
- Coordinates: 41°8′48″N 73°16′2″W
- Area: 1.4 acres (0.57 ha)
- Built: 1840
- Architect: Joseph Collins Wells
- Architectural style: Gothic Revival
- NRHP reference No.: 84000247

Significant dates
- Added to NRHP: November 23, 1984
- Designated NHL: April 19, 1994

The Jonathan Sturges House is a historic house at 449 Mill Plain Road in Fairfield, Connecticut. Built in 1840 to a design by Joseph Collins Wells, it is one of the oldest-known and best-documented examples of architect-designed Gothic Revival architecture. The house was declared a National Historic Landmark in 1994 for its architectural significance. It was designed and built for Jonathan Sturges (1802–74), a New York City businessman and patron of the arts, in whose family the property remains.

== Description ==
The Sturges House is a rambling wood-frame structure, with more than 30 rooms and 11 staircases. It was built in four stages between 1840 and 1895, and has seen relatively little alteration since then. The exterior is almost entirely clad in board-and batten siding, except for some gable ends which are clapboarded. The gables are typically steeply pitched, and are all decorated with bargeboard, pendants and finials. The single-story porch consists of segmented-arch sections decorated with latticework trim. The house's chimneys are topped by decorative pots or brickwork. The general massing of the structure is asymmetrical, at least partly a consequence of the three major additions made to the house, giving it a late Victorian structure with Gothic Revival trim.

The main block of the house, built in 1840, is the first known commission of the British-born architect Joseph C. Wells, whose best-known commissions are the later First Presbyterian Church in Manhattan, and the Roseland Cottage in Woodstock, Connecticut (the latter is also a National Historic Landmark Gothic Revival summer house). It is one of the earliest known examples of architect-designed Gothic Revival architecture, a style more often taken by local builders from pattern books published by the style's proponents. Additions and alterations in 1846, 1883, and 1895 were probably also designed by architects, but plans have not been found. The Wells commission is extremely well-documented by the Sturges family, and includes original color drawings. Notable innovations in the house's design include a combined water closet and bathing room, a development that did not see wider acceptance until the 1850s.

Jonathan Sturges (1802–74) was a wealthy New York City businessman, and the grandson of Jonathan Sturges, who represented Fairfield in the Continental Congress during the American Revolutionary War. Sturges made his fortune as a wholesale grocer, and was a significant influence in the development of the art community in New York, commissioning artwork from American artists, and promoting the establishment of exhibition galleries modeled on the National Gallery of London.

== See also ==
- List of National Historic Landmarks in Connecticut
- National Register of Historic Places listings in Fairfield County, Connecticut
