= Jonathan Sturges (businessman) =

American businessman and arts patron

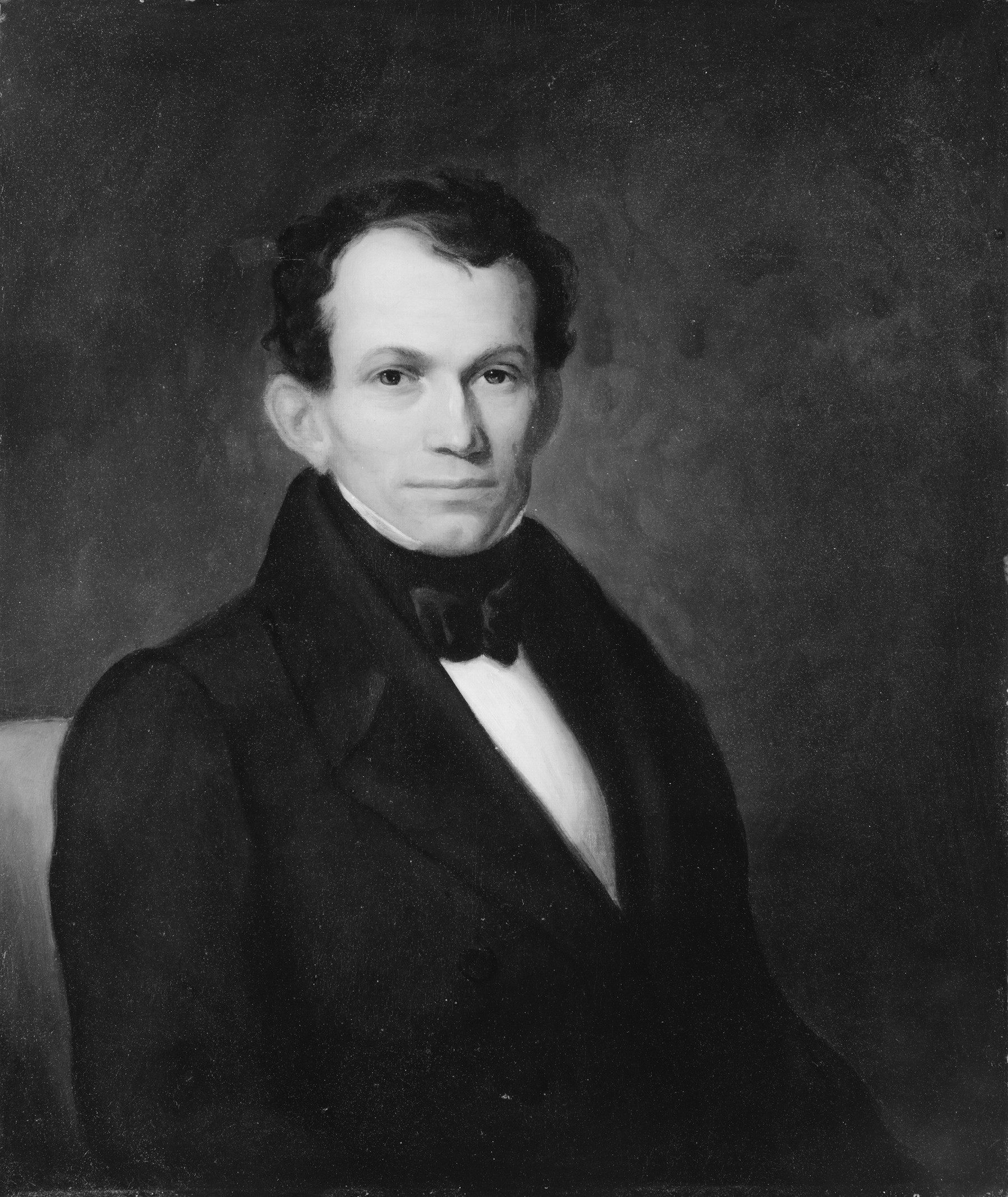
- Portrait of Sturges by Asher Brown Durand, c. 1840
- Born: March 24, 1802; Southport, Connecticut, U.S.
- Died: November 28, 1874 (aged 72); New York City, New York, U.S.
- Occupations: Businessman, arts patron, philanthropist
- Spouse: Mary Pemberton Cady (m. 1828)
- Parent(s): Barnabas Lothrop Sturges; Mary Sturges
- Relatives: Lewis Burr Sturges (uncle); Jonathan Sturges (grandfather); Henry Fairfield Osborn (grandson); William Church Osborn (grandson)

Jonathan Sturges (March 24, 1802 – November 28, 1874) was an American businessman, arts patron, and philanthropist.

== Early life ==
He was born in Southport, Connecticut on March 24, 1802. He was the son of Barnabas Lothrop Sturges (1769–1831) and Mary (née Sturges) Sturges (1771–1840). His older sister, Mary Ann Sturges, was the wife of William Lockwood and his brother, Lothrop Sturges, was the husband of Jane Freeman Corry.

His paternal uncle and grandfather, Lewis Burr Sturges and Jonathan Sturges, were both U.S. Representatives from Connecticut, and his maternal grandparents were Hezekiah Sturges and Abigail (née Dimon) Sturges.

== Career ==
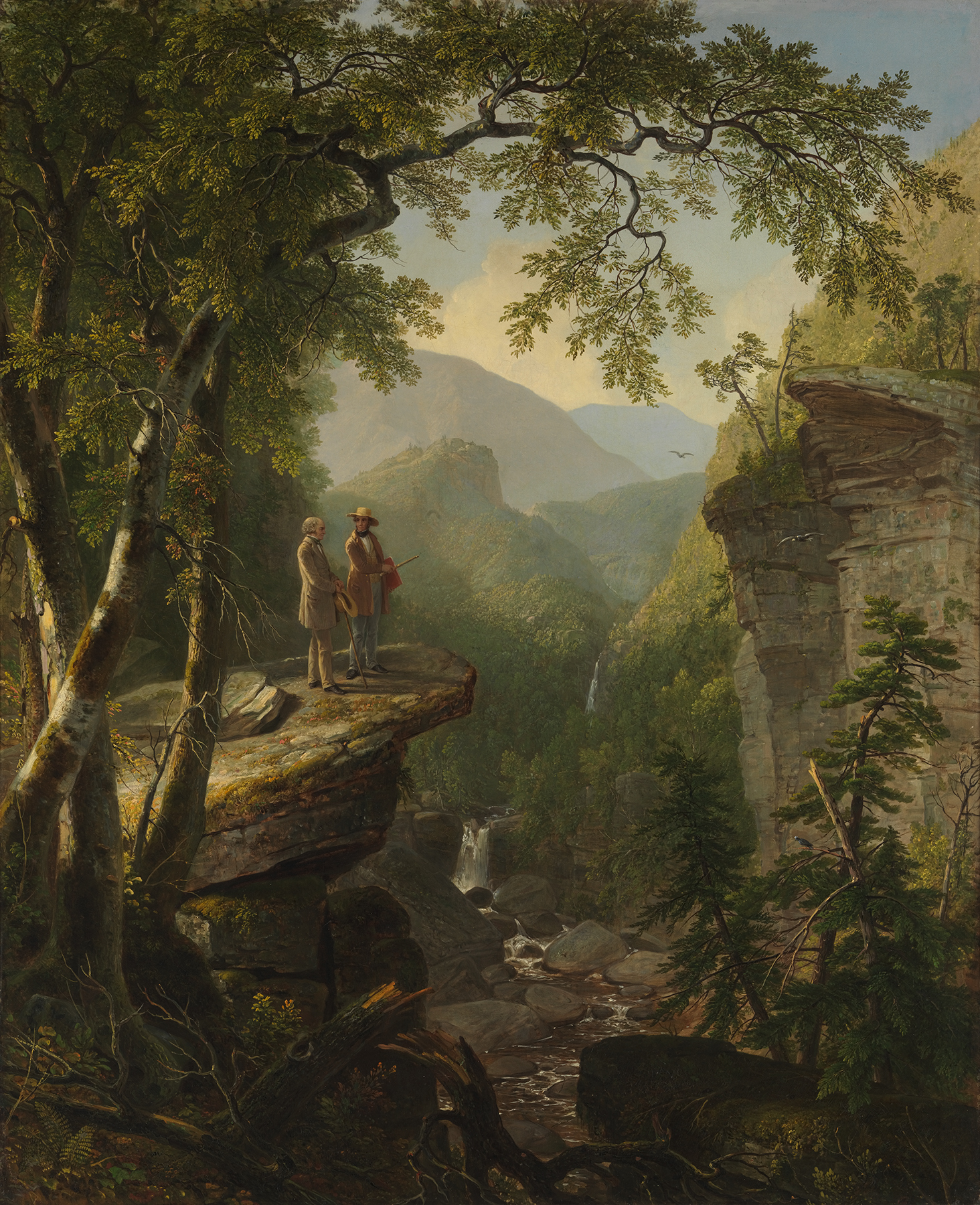
Kindred Spirits, commissioned by Sturges as a gift for William Cullen Bryant in gratitude for the nature poet's eulogy to Thomas Cole.

Sturges' father had a failed business (he built a vessel which was captured by the French on its first voyage), so, after receiving a "liberal education", in 1821, Jonathan went to New York City and worked as a clerk in Luman Reed's grocery business at 125 Front Street. Eventually, in 1828, became a one-third partner in the reorganized firm of Reed, Hemstead Sturges, followed by senior partner upon the death of Reed in June 1836. Reed was Sturges' introduction to arts patronage. Sturges retired from "mercantile pursuits" in 1868 and left the business in the hands of Benjamin G. Arnold, the founding president of the Coffee Exchange in the 1880s.

With the success of his mercantile business, he moved into other enterprises. He was a founder and director of the Bank of Commerce of New York, a founder and director of the Illinois Central Railroad, and a shareholder in the New York, New Haven and Hartford Railroad. He helped found the Union League Club of New York and became its second president in 1863.

=== Arts patronage ===
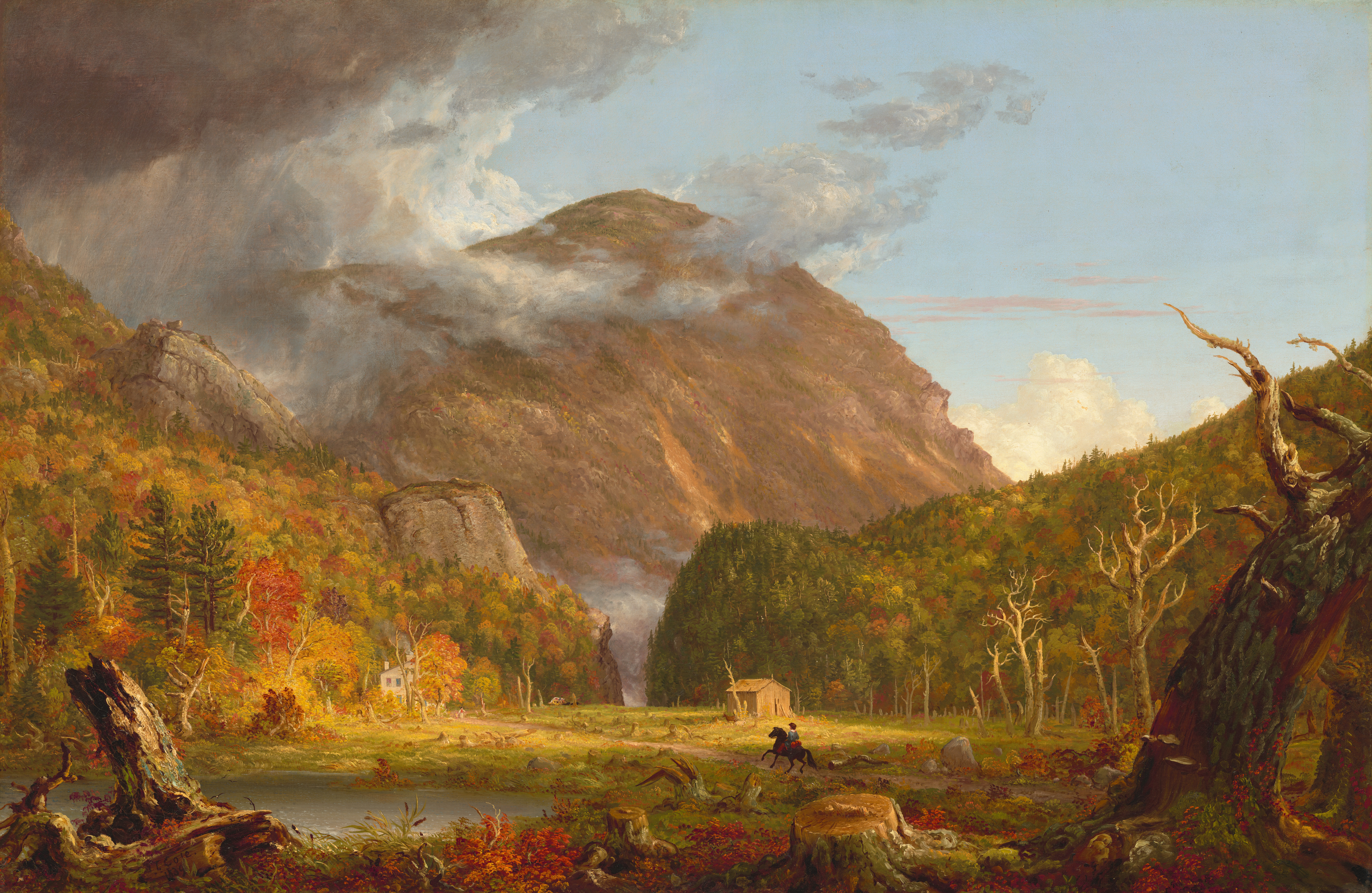
A View of the Mountain Pass Called the Notch of the White Mountains, by Thomas Cole, 1839.

Sturges became an important American patron of the arts, acquiring Luman Reed's collection with a group following Reed's death in 1836. He commissioned numerous paintings from American artists, such as Kindred Spirits, a tribute to Thomas Cole by Asher Brown Durand; Durand also made portraits of the Sturges family.

The group created the New-York Gallery of Fine Arts for Reed's collection, which eventually went to the New York Historical Society. Sturges patronized other American artists such as Frederic Edwin Church, Henry Inman, William Sidney Mount, John Gadsby Chapman, Henry Kirke Brown, Henry Peters Gray, Charles C. Ingham, and Robert W. Weir.

In Henry Tuckerman's 1867 Book of the Artists, Sturges' art collection was included as one of the ten most significant private art collections in New York City.

== Personal life ==
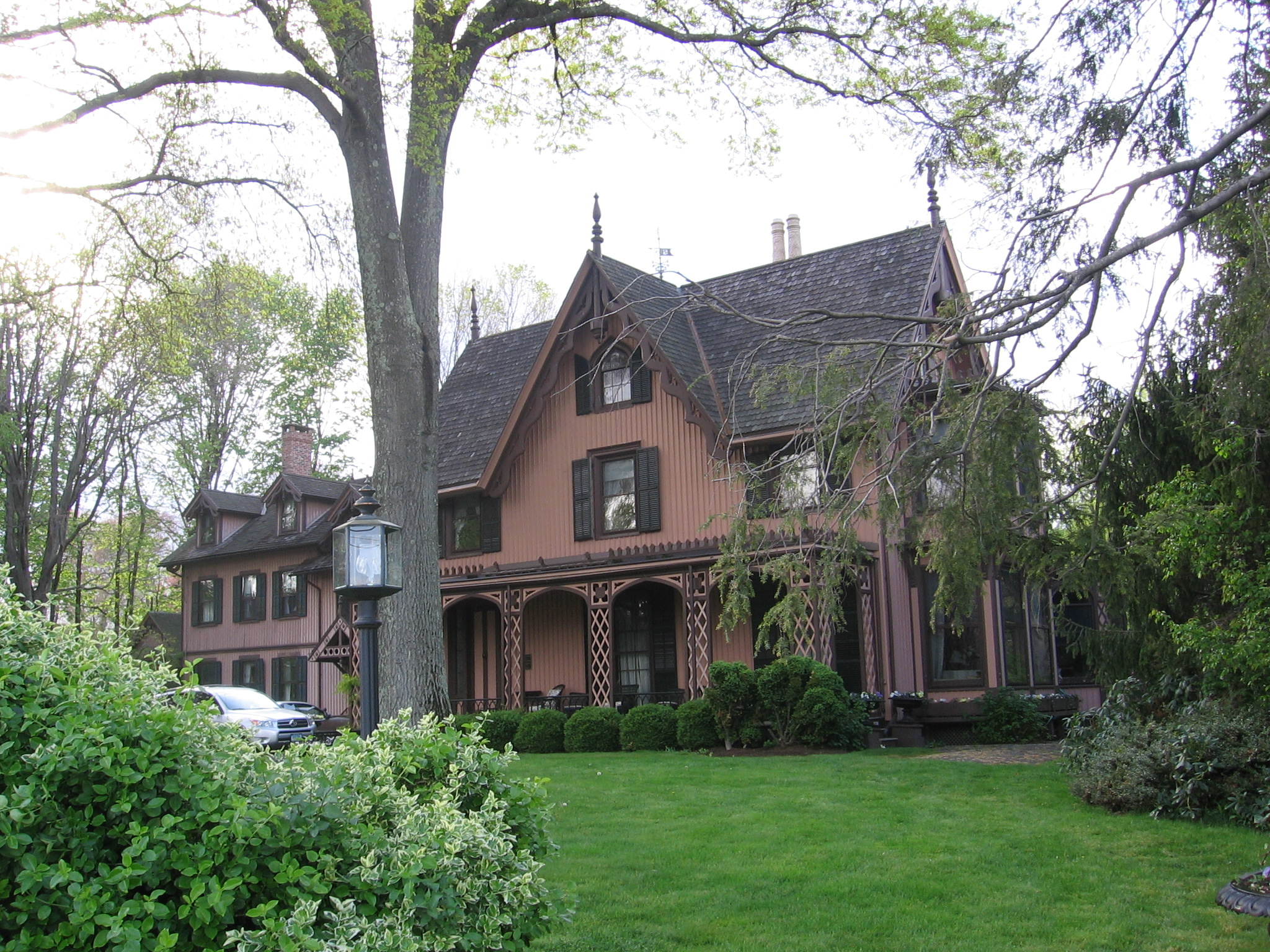
The Sturges House in Fairfield, Connecticut.

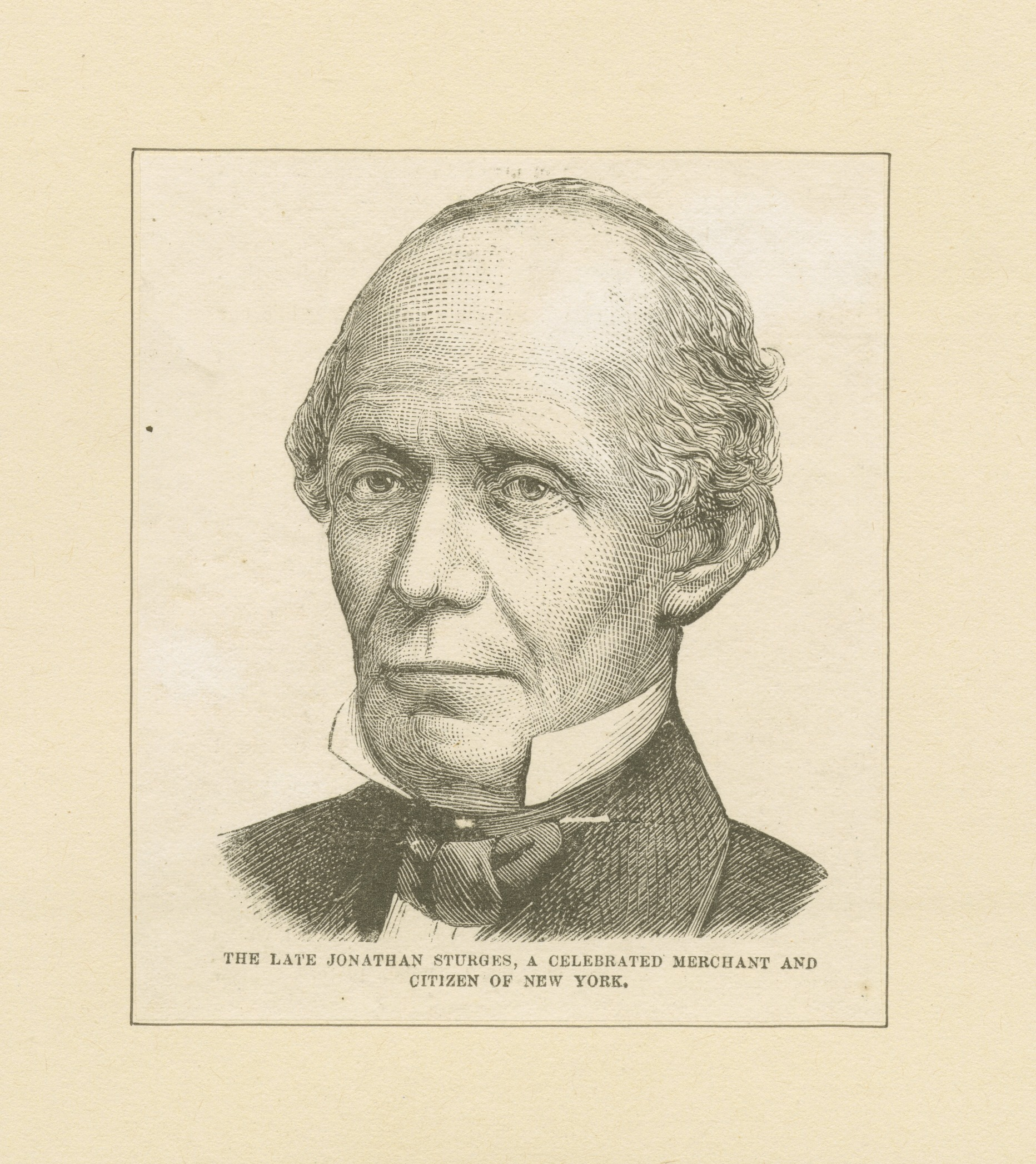
The late Jonathan Sturges, a celebrated merchant and citizen of New York, 1861-c. 1880

On October 25, 1828, Sturges was married to Mary Pemberton Cady (1806–1894), the daughter of Ebenezer Pemberton Cady (a grandson of Ebenezer Pemberton) and Elizabeth Smith Cady. Together, they had a house in New York City and a summer residence on Mill Plain Road in Fairfield, a Gothic Revival home designed in 1840 by English architect Joseph Collins Wells, today known as the Jonathan Sturges House (the property remains in the family). Mary and Jonathan were the parents of five children, including:

- Virginia Reed Sturges (1830–1902), who married railroad executive William H. Osborn in 1853.
- Frederick Sturges (1833–1917), who married Mary Reed Fuller (1834–1886), daughter of Dudley B. Fuller.
- Amelia Sturges (1835–1862), who married J. P. Morgan in 1861, but died of tuberculosis soon after. In Morgan's will, he left $100,000 to the House of Rest for Consumptives in her honor.
- Arthur Pemberton Sturges (1842–1866), who entered Princeton Theological Seminary, but died before graduating.
- Henry Cady Sturges (1846–1922), who married Sarah Adams MacWhorter (1864–1959), daughter of George Gray MacWhorter.

Sturges died on November 28, 1874, at his residence, 40 East 36th Street in Manhattan. After a funeral at his residence, and at the Reformed Church at Fifth Avenue and 29th Street, he was buried at Fairfield East Cemetery in Fairfield, Connecticut. In his will, he appointed his on Frederick and his son-in-law William Osborn as executors and trustees.

=== Descendants ===
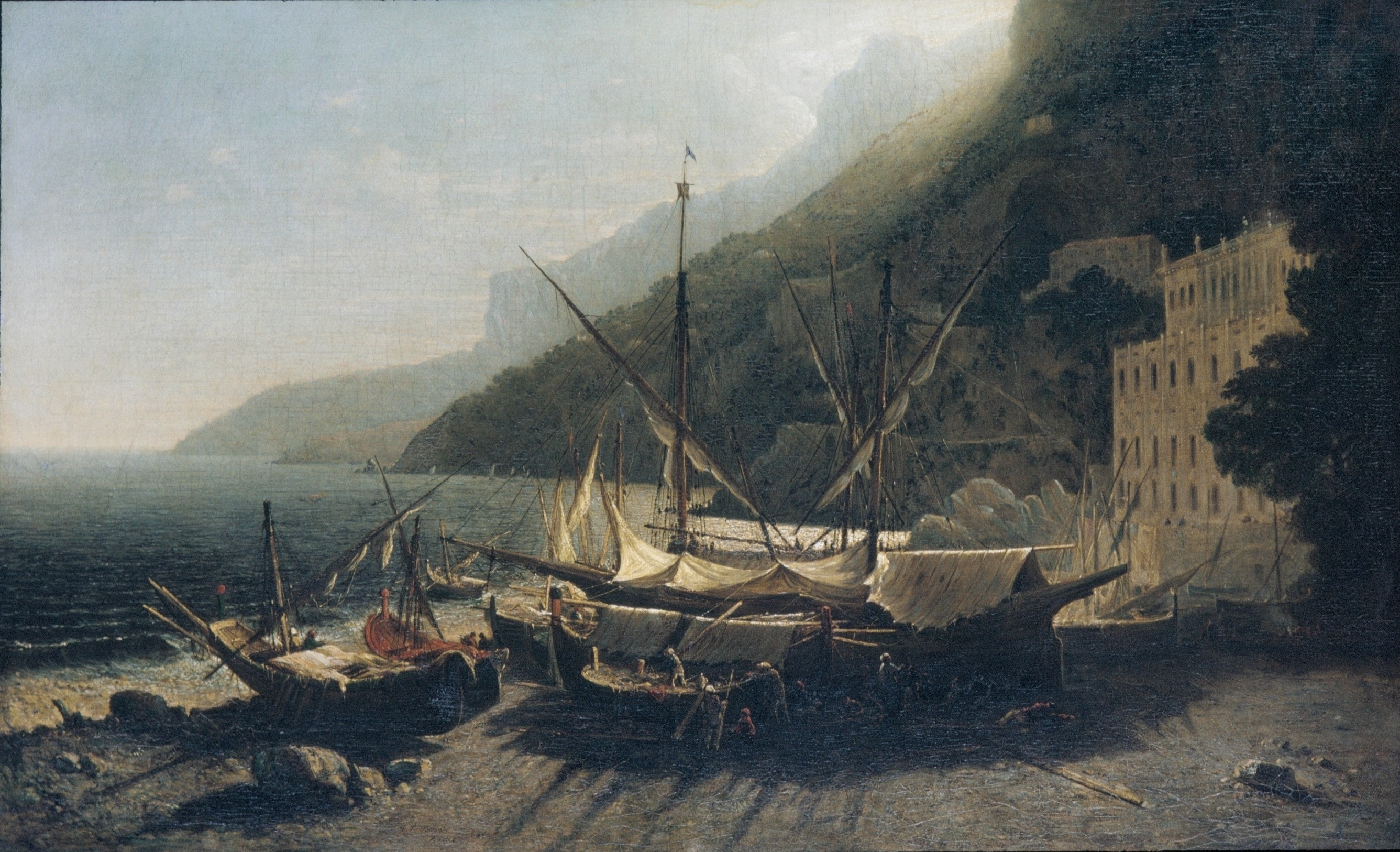
View at Amalfi, Bay of Salerno, by George Loring Brown, 1857.

Through his eldest daughter, he was a grandfather of Henry Fairfield Osborn (1857–1935), a geologist, paleontologist, and eugenist who served as president of the American Museum of Natural History, and married writer Lucretia Thatcher Perry, daughter of Brigadier General Alexander James Perry and sister of Josephine Adams Perry (who married Junius Spencer Morgan II); and William Church Osborn (1862–1951), who served as president of the Metropolitan Museum of Art, and married philanthropist and social reformer Alice Clinton Hoadley Dodge, a daughter of William E. Dodge Jr.

His grandson, William Church Osborn, who inherited Sturges' View at Amalfi, Bay of Salerno, from his grandmother, donated the painting by George Loring Brown to the Metropolitan Museum of Art in 1903 (of which Sturges was active in establishing), as well as the 1846 The Flower Girl by Charles Cromwell Ingham, in 1902.
