= Florence and Isaac Budovitch House =

- U.S. National Register of Historic Places
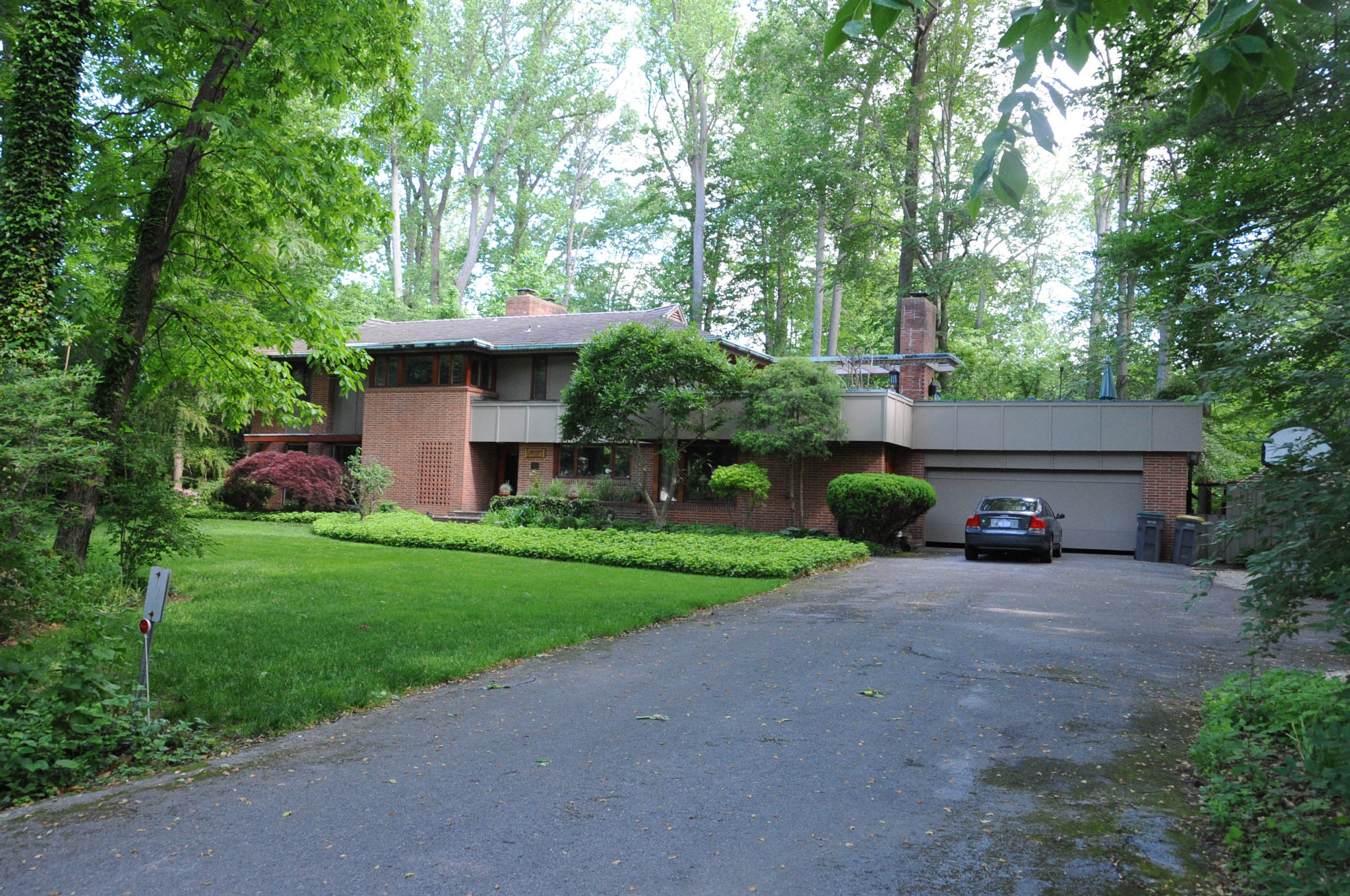
- Florence and Isaac Budovitch House, May 2020

- Location within Delaware Location within the United States
- Location: 4611 Bedford Blvd, Wilmington, Delaware
- Coordinates: 39°47′00″N 75°31′37″W
- Built: c. 1955
- Architectural style: Edgar Tafel
- NRHP reference No.: 100004954
- Added to NRHP: January 30, 2020

Florence and Isaac Budovitch House is a historic home located at Wilmington, New Castle County, Delaware. It was added to the National Register of Historic Places in 2020.

== History ==
The Florence and Isaac Budovitch House was built by Edgar Tafel, who was commissioned by Florence and Isaac Budovitch to build a house as they faced anti-Semitism in the housing market. It was constructed between 1955 and 1956 in a Contemporary style with Prairie School/Wrightian influences.
