= Edgar Tafel =

American architect (1912–2011)

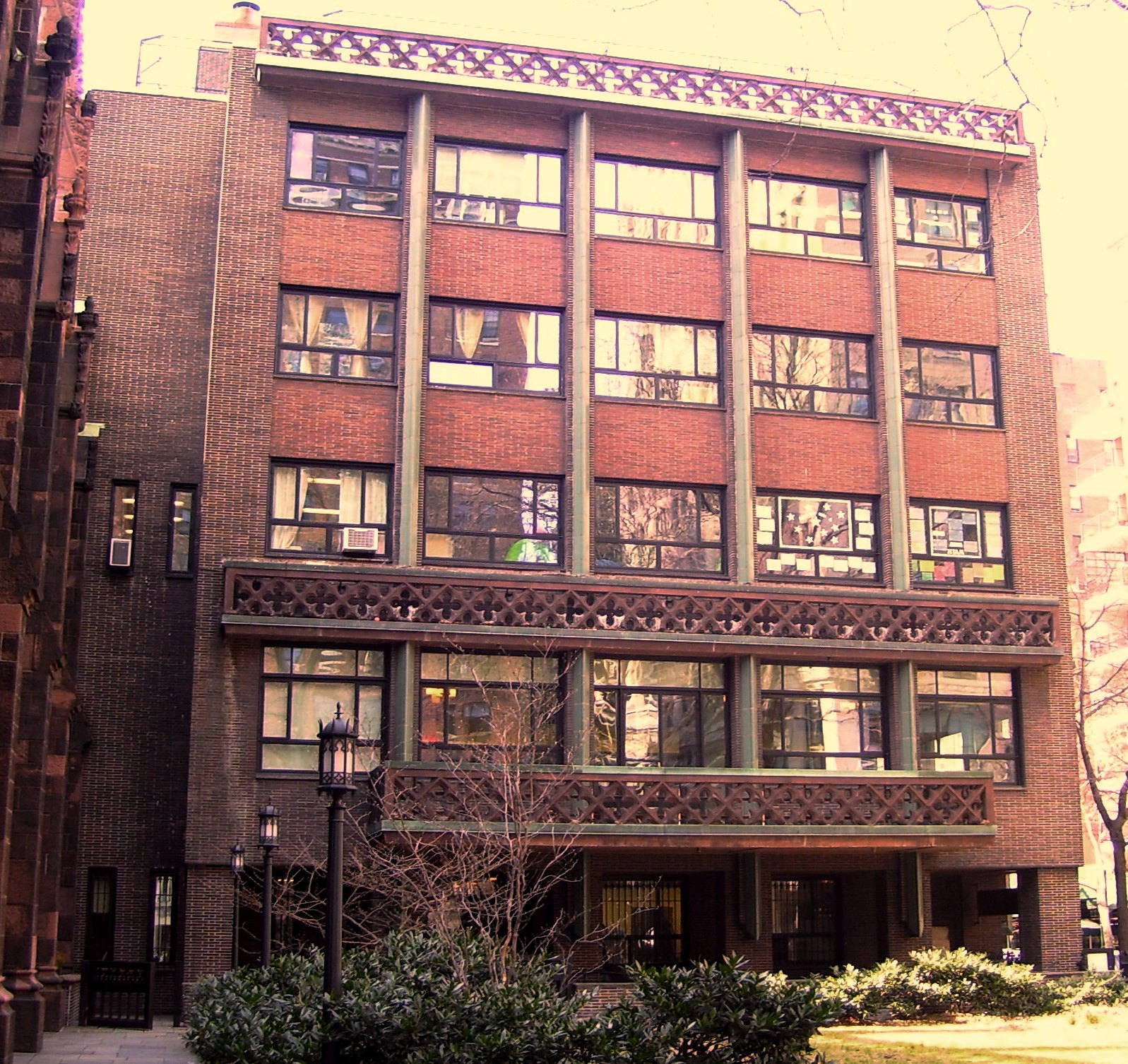
The Church House Tafel designed for the First Presbyterian Church in Manhattan was built between 1958 and 1960 and received a design award from the Fifth Avenue Association.

Edgar A. Tafel (March 12, 1912 – January 18, 2011) was an American architect, best known as a disciple of Frank Lloyd Wright.

== Early life and education ==
Tafel was born in New York City to Russian Jewish immigrants, and moved to New Jersey with his dressmaking parents. He was educated at the Ferrer Center and Colony, the Walden School in Manhattan, and New York University.

Tafel began his career as an apprentice to Frank Lloyd Wright at Taliesin along with Wesley Peters, John "Jack" Howe and Abram Dombar, among others. Tafel was considered the "unofficial guardian of the Frank Lloyd Wright School", despite the rift that had developed between Tafel and his late mentor when Tafel, after a 9-year residency, left Taliesin to pursue his own work and family. Tafel worked on several of Wright's most famous projects including Fallingwater, Wingspread, and the Johnson Wax Headquarters.

== Career ==
=== Architecture ===
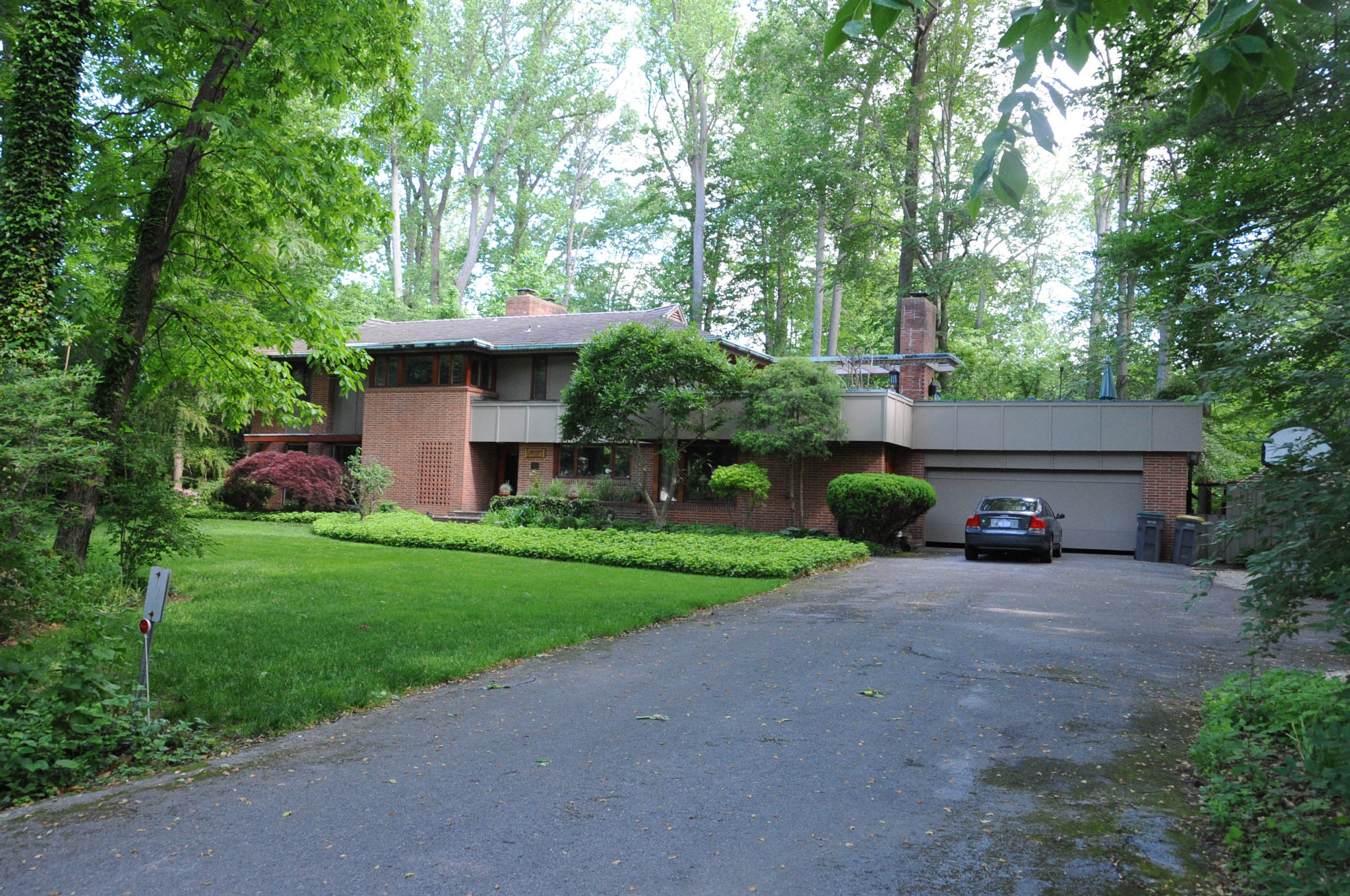
Florence and Isaac Budovitch House in Wilmington, Delaware

Tafel served in a photographic analysis unit during World War II. After the war, he opened his own architectural office in New York City. One of his best known works as a solo practitioner is the Mellin Macnab Building for the First Presbyterian Church on Fifth Avenue in Manhattan, New York City. Tafel's design combined Prairie School influences with the Gothic style of the sanctuary, and the New York City Landmarks Preservation Commission called it "a fine example of contemporary design ... used intelligently, to bring a much needed contemporary building into harmony with a neighborhood." The building received a design award from the Fifth Avenue Association.

Tafel's other designs included the Protestant Chapel at Kennedy International Airport, which is no longer extant, and St. John's in the Village Episcopal Church in Greenwich Village, built in 1972-1974, replacing a sanctuary which burned down in 1971 with a new Greek Revival-influenced modern design. He was also responsible for the 1964 master plan for the campus of SUNY Geneseo and its "design gem" Brodie Hall, as well as the college's South Village residential complex, the 1947 Silver House and the Henry and Gladys Nelsen House in Racine, Wisconsin, the North Wing expansion to the Allentown Art Museum in Allentown, Pennsylvania and the private home of Florence and Isaac Budovitch in Wilmington, Delaware (1955). He was also the master designer for community colleges in Johnstown and Hudson, New York. Over his career, Tafel designed 80 houses, 35 churches and other religious buildings, and three college campuses.

=== Author ===
Tafel also wrote books, including Apprentice to Genius: Years with Frank Lloyd Wright (1979) and About Wright: An Album of Recollections by Those Who Knew Frank Lloyd Wright (1993), which he also edited, as well as producing The Frank Lloyd Wright Way, a film which won first prize at the 1995 Houston International Film Festival.

=== Philanthropy ===
In 2006, Tafel gave $3.2 million to Cornell University's Department of Architecture. to endow the Edgar A. Tafel Professorship in Architecture and the Tafel Architecture Lecture Series.

=== Death and legacy ===
Tafel died at the age of 98 in New York City on January 18, 2011. He was the last member of the original Taliesin Fellows to die. Tafel had been married twice, ending respectively in divorce and the death of his second wife in 1951. He had no children.

Following his death, his architectural archive was donated to the Avery Architectural and Fine Arts Library of Columbia University in New York City. His collection includes information on Frank Lloyd Wright, as well as drawings and other items related to Tafel's own architectural practice.

== Awards and honors ==
- Doctor of Fine Arts, Honoris Causa from SUNY Geneseo, 2001
- Edgar Tafel Distinguished Chair in the School of Architecture at University of Illinois at Urbana Champaign
