= First Presbyterian Church (Brooklyn) =

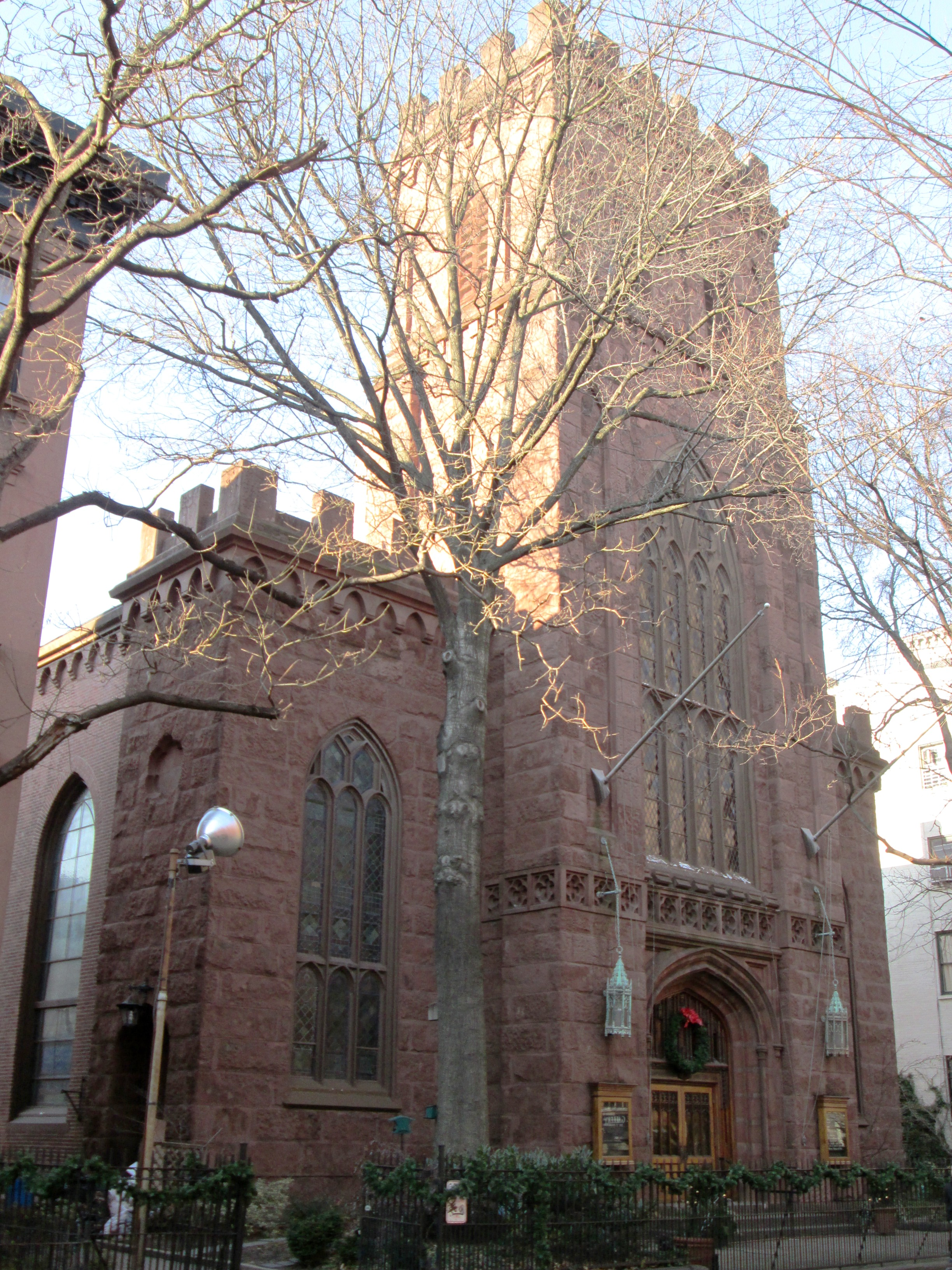
The church in 2013

The First Presbyterian Church, located at 124 Henry Street between Pierrepont and Clark Streets in the Brooklyn Heights neighborhood of Brooklyn, New York City was built in 1846 and was designed by William B. Olmstead in the Gothic Revival style. The church's memorial doorway was added in 1921 and was designed by James Gamble Rogers. Architecturally, the church's dominant feature is its 90-foot (27 m) crenellated tower with pointed arch windows. Many of the stained glass windows in the church are by the Louis Comfort Tiffany Studios.

The church – which is part of the Brooklyn Heights Historic District, created by the New York City Landmarks Preservation Commission on November 23, 1965 – has been described as "solid, stolid and dour," but also as "bold but somewhat naive".

The congregation was founded in 1822, at a time when affluent merchants were beginning to move to the neighborhood from Manhattan. Their original church was located on Cranberry Street between Henry and Hicks Streets, and was where the celebration of Brooklyn's official incorporation as a city was held. That site was bought by the Plymouth Church when the First Presbyterian Church, needing to expand, moved to its present location.

At the time of the Old School-New School schism in American Presbyterianism over slavery and other issues, some members of the church, in reaction to the "New School" abolitionist preaching of Dr. Samuel Hanson Cox – who was the church's pastor for 17 years – split to start an "Old School" church, located at Remsen and Clinton Streets, while others left to help start the Church of the Pilgrims or joined the Plymouth Church.

The congregation began the Heights Fellowship (1949-52) under the leadership of Philip Elliot (1931-1961), to encourage ecumenism, racial harmony and internationalism. This same program was also promoted by Paul Smith at the end of the 1980s.
