= David C. Fisher =

American author, professor, and a pastor

David Charles Fisher (born 1943) is an American author, professor, and a pastor who was the senior pastor at Park Street Church in Boston from 1989 to 1995 and the senior pastor at Plymouth Church in Brooklyn, New York from 2004 to 2013.

== Life and work ==
Fisher was born in Warsaw, Indiana, while his father, Reverend Emery Nile Fisher, was attending seminary there. Fisher graduated from Bryan College in 1967 and then received a Master of Divinity from Trinity Evangelical Divinity School, and later he received his Ph.D. in New Testament Interpretation from the Southern Baptist Theological Seminary with further graduate study at Hebrew Union College and Indiana University. Fisher's academic focus is the Jewish background of early Christianity. Fisher has served as instructor of New Testament at The Southern Baptist Theological Seminary and as adjunct professor of New Testament at Gordon-Conwell Theological Seminary and adjunct professor at Bethel Theological Seminary. He served as pastor of Park Street Church in Boston from 1989 to 1995, then the Colonial Church in Edina, Minnesota. From 2004 until 2013 he was the senior minister at Plymouth Church, a historic congregational church in Brooklyn, New York. During the nine years of his ministry at Plymouth Church, Rev. Fisher's almost doubled the membership of the congregations and implemented new programs that advanced the mission of the church.

Fisher has published a popular book entitled The Twenty-First Century Pastor: A Vision Based on the Apostle Paul, which is in its eighth printing and cited by dozens of other publications. In addition to Fisher's many academic and popular articles and publications, interviews and articles about Fisher have appeared in news sources, such as the New York Sun, Boston Globe, and CNN.

== Partial list of works ==
Books

- The 21st Century Pastor: A Vision Based on the Apostle Paul (Zondervan, 1996) (eight printings)(author).
- John R. Cionca, Dear Pastor: Ministry Advice from Seasoned Pastors (Group Pub., 2007) (contributor)
- G. McIntosh, Evaluating the church growth movement: 5 views (Zondervan, 2004) (contributor)
- E. Glenn Wagner, Escape from Church, Inc. (Zondervan, 2011) (contributor)
- "Easter Fear," by David C. Fisher, The Library of Distinctive Sermons, Volume 6, 1997, (Sisters, Oregon: Questar Publishers, 1996) (pp. 209–224). (10 Volumes). (chapter contributor)
- A critical analysis of I Thessalonians 4:13-18, M.A. Thesis
- A critical assessment of the concept of Biblical unity in the writings of C. H. Dodd, Ph.D. Dissertation

Articles

- "Thoughts on a Son's 13th Birthday," Family Life Today (April, 1983)
- "A New Context in Ministry," Christianity Today (1990)
- " Prayers from a Pastor's Heart" Christianity Today (1986)
- "Traditional vs. Contemporary," Christianity Today (1997)

Sermons

- "Free at Last", Galatians 5:1; Luke 4:16-21; John 8:31-32, July 6, 2008
- "A Long and Winding Road," Philippians 3:12-4:1, March 4, 2007
- "How Firm a Foundation", Matthew 5:1-12, January 30, 2011
