= Plymouth Church (Brooklyn) =

Congregational church in New York City

- U.S. National Register of Historic Places
- U.S. National Historic Landmark
- U.S. National Historic Landmark District – Contributing property
- New York State Register of Historic Places
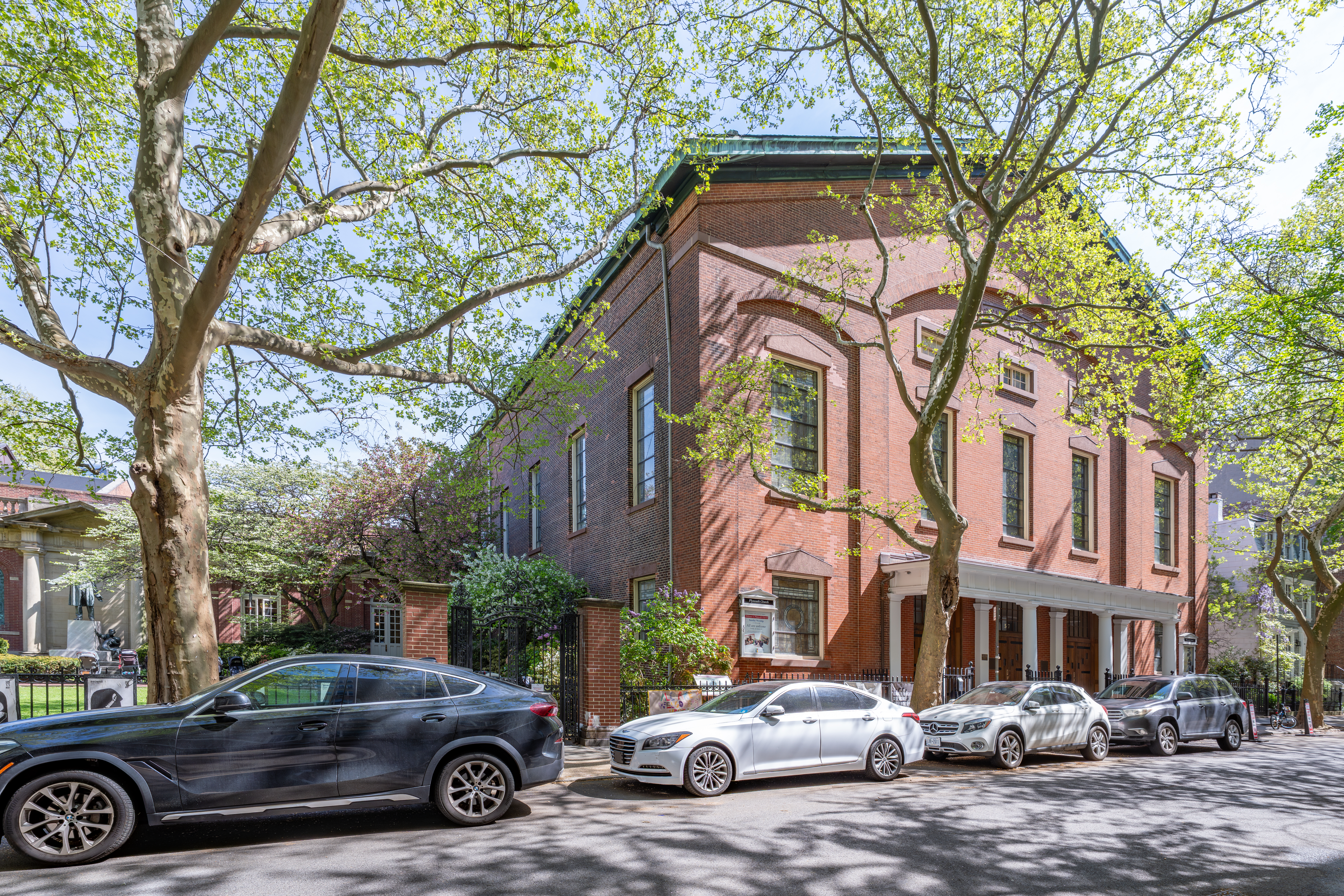

- Location within New York City Location within New York Location within the United States
- Location: 57 Orange Street; Brooklyn, New York
- Coordinates: 40°41′57.4″N 73°59′36.8″W
- Built: 1849-50
- Architects: Joseph C. Wells; Woodruff Leeming
- Part of: Brooklyn Heights Historic District (ID66000524)
- NRHP reference No.: 66000525
- NYSRHP No.: 04701.000542

Significant dates
- Added to NRHP: October 15, 1966
- Designated NHL: July 4, 1961
- Designated NHLDCP: January 12, 1965
- Designated NYSRHP: June 23, 1980

Plymouth Church is a Congregational church located at 57 Orange Street, between Henry and Hicks Streets, in the Brooklyn Heights neighborhood of Brooklyn, New York City. The Church House is located at 75 Hicks Street. The church was built in 1849–50 and was designed by Joseph C. Wells. Under the leadership of its first minister, Henry Ward Beecher, the church played a prominent role in slavery abolitionist activities during the mid-19th century.

Plymouth Church is listed on the National Register of Historic Places as a National Historic Landmark. It is part of the Brooklyn Heights Historic District, which is a National Historic Landmark District and a New York City designated landmark district.

The church is a member of the National Association of Congregational Christian Churches.

== History ==
Plymouth Church was founded in 1847 by a group of 21 individuals from New England, associated with a network that included wealthy anti-slavery merchants Arthur and Lewis Tappan. Among the founders were businessmen such as Henry C. Bowen, John Tasker Howard, David Hale, and Seth Hunt. It was the third Congregationalist church established in Brooklyn, which at the time was an independent city. The site for the church building was purchased from the First Presbyterian Church, which had occupied the location since 1822 but had outgrown the space and relocated to a new site a few blocks away on Henry Street.

Henry Ward Beecher served as the church’s first pastor and became a prominent figure in the abolitionist movement. His sister, Harriet Beecher Stowe, authored the 1852 anti-slavery novel Uncle Tom’s Cabin. During this period, Plymouth Church became associated with anti-slavery efforts and was identified as a station on the Underground Railroad, through which slaves were secretly transported to Canada. The church's basement was used to conceal fugitives, and the building was locally referred to as "the Grand Central Depot". Charles Bennett Ray, a Black minister and editor of The Colored American newspaper, is documented as having brought fugitives to the church. Plymouth Church remains one of the few Underground Railroad-associated congregations in New York still operating in its original location.

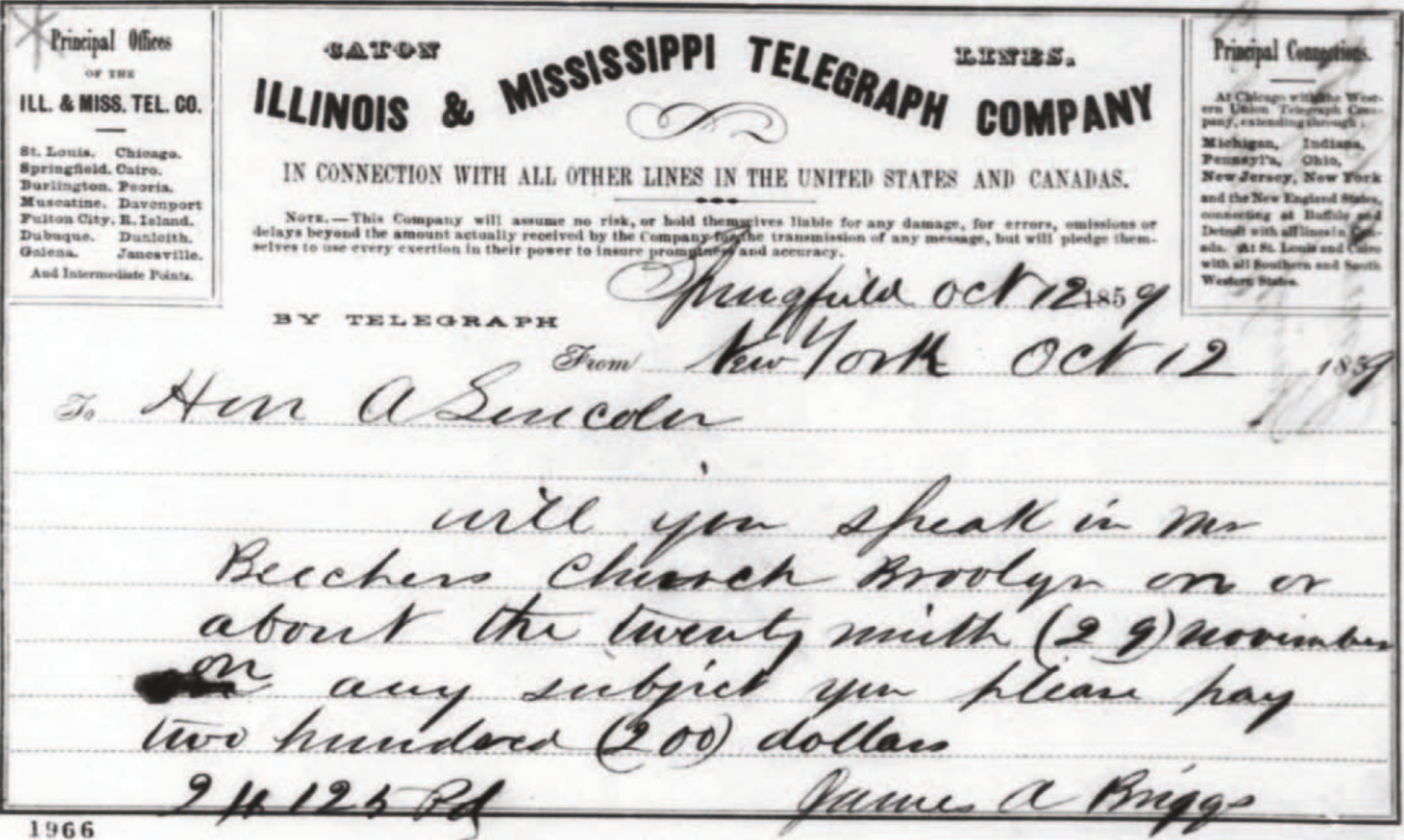
1859 Telegram inviting Lincoln to speak at Plymouth Church

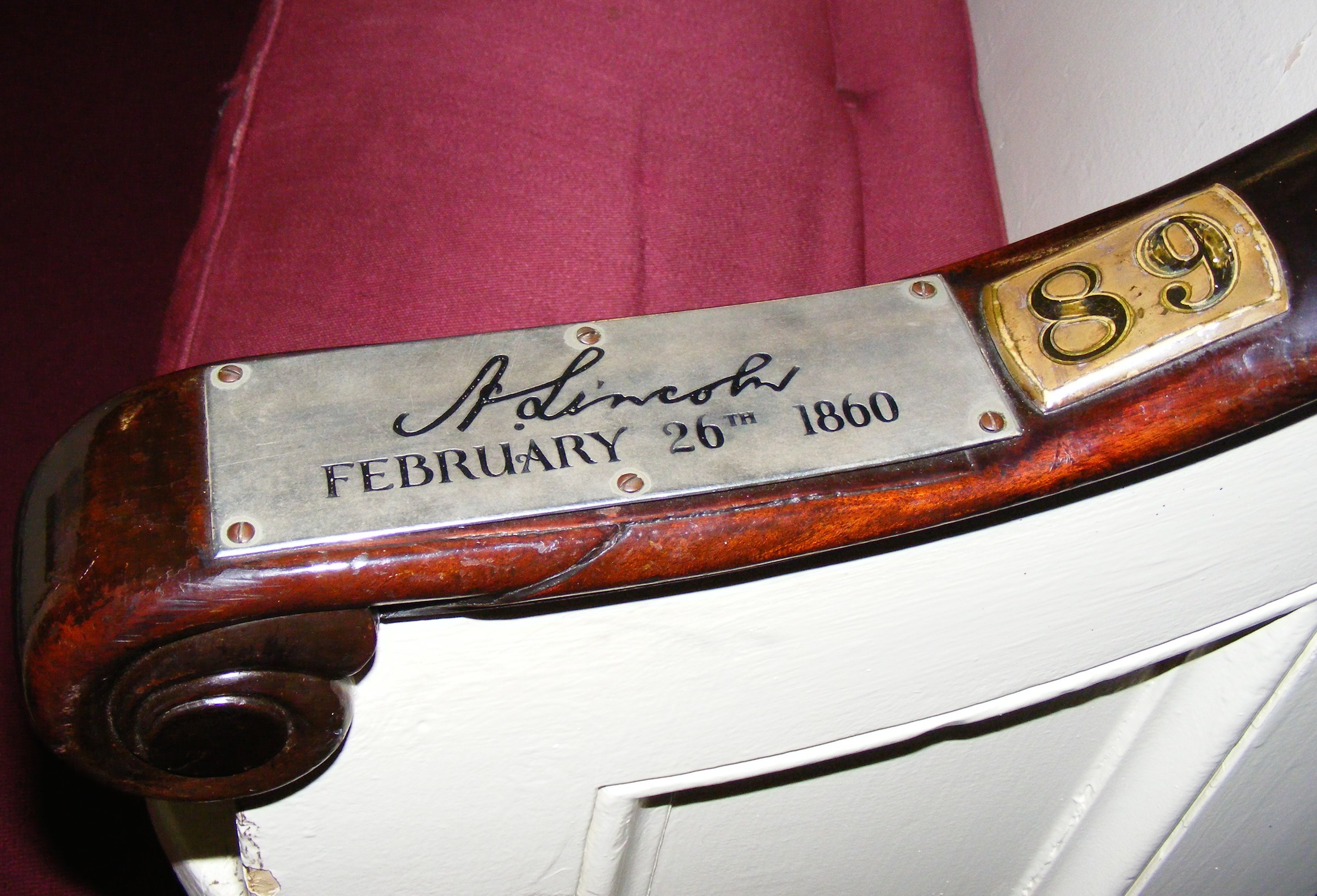
Plaque on the pew where Abraham Lincoln attended service

One of the prominent recurring events at Plymouth Church during the 19th century was a series of mock slave auctions conducted by Beecher. These events were intended to raise funds to purchase the freedom of enslaved individuals. Beecher would stage auctions within the church sanctuary, with the proceeds used to emancipate the individuals involved. The most well-known case involved Sally Maria Diggs, an enslaved child who had escaped from Alabama. On February 5, 1860, before a congregation of approximately 3,000 people, Beecher initiated a collection, and when a plate containing $900 and a gold ring reached the pulpit, he placed the ring on Diggs’s finger and declared, "Remember, with this ring I do wed thee to freedom". Diggs, later known as Rose Ward Hunt, returned to Plymouth Church 67 years later and returned the ring.

In October 1859, Plymouth Church extended an invitation to Abraham Lincoln to speak to the congregation, offering a fee of $200. Lincoln accepted and attended services at the church on February 26, 1860. A plaque now marks the pew where he sat. His lecture, initially planned for Plymouth, was moved to Cooper Union in Manhattan, where he delivered a speech opposing the expansion of slavery.

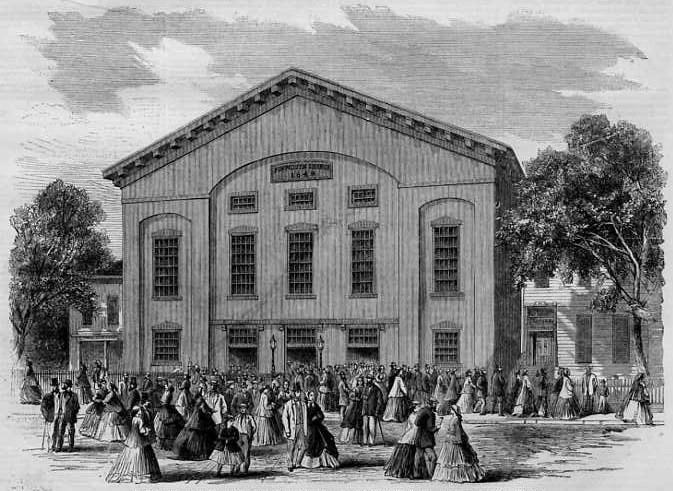
Plymouth Church (ca. 1866)

In 1867, a group from Plymouth Church joined a five-and-a-half-month journey aboard the steamer Quaker City to Europe and the Holy Land. Mark Twain accompanied the group as a journalist and later wrote The Innocents Abroad, a satirical account of the trip that became his best-selling work during his lifetime.

Throughout the 1870s, the church was at the center of a nationally publicized controversy known as the Beecher-Tilton Scandal Case. Allegations of an extramarital relationship between Beecher and Elizabeth Tilton, the wife of church member and journalist Theodore Tilton, led to a two-and-a-half-year trial and ecclesiastical investigation. The proceedings resulted in Beecher's exoneration by the church, the disfellowshipping of Theodore Tilton, and criticism of Beecher from figures such as Victoria Woodhull, Elizabeth Cady Stanton and Isabella Beecher Hooker.

Beecher died in 1887 and was succeeded by several ministers including Lyman Abbott (1887–1899); Newell Dwight Hillis (1899–1924), who oversaw the completion of the Plymouth campus as it exists today; J. Stanley Durkee (1926–1940), a former President of Howard University; L. Wendell Fifield (1941–1955), L. Wendell Fifield (1941-1955), the former pastor of Plymouth Congregational Church in Seattle; and Harry H. Kruener (1960–1984), former dean of the chapel at Denison University. In 1991, the Rev. Sharon Blackburn became the first female minister in the church's history served as associate pastor of Brooklyn's First Presbyterian Church, following the tenures of Rev. Frank Goodwin (1985–1988) and Rev. Richard Stanger (1988–1991).

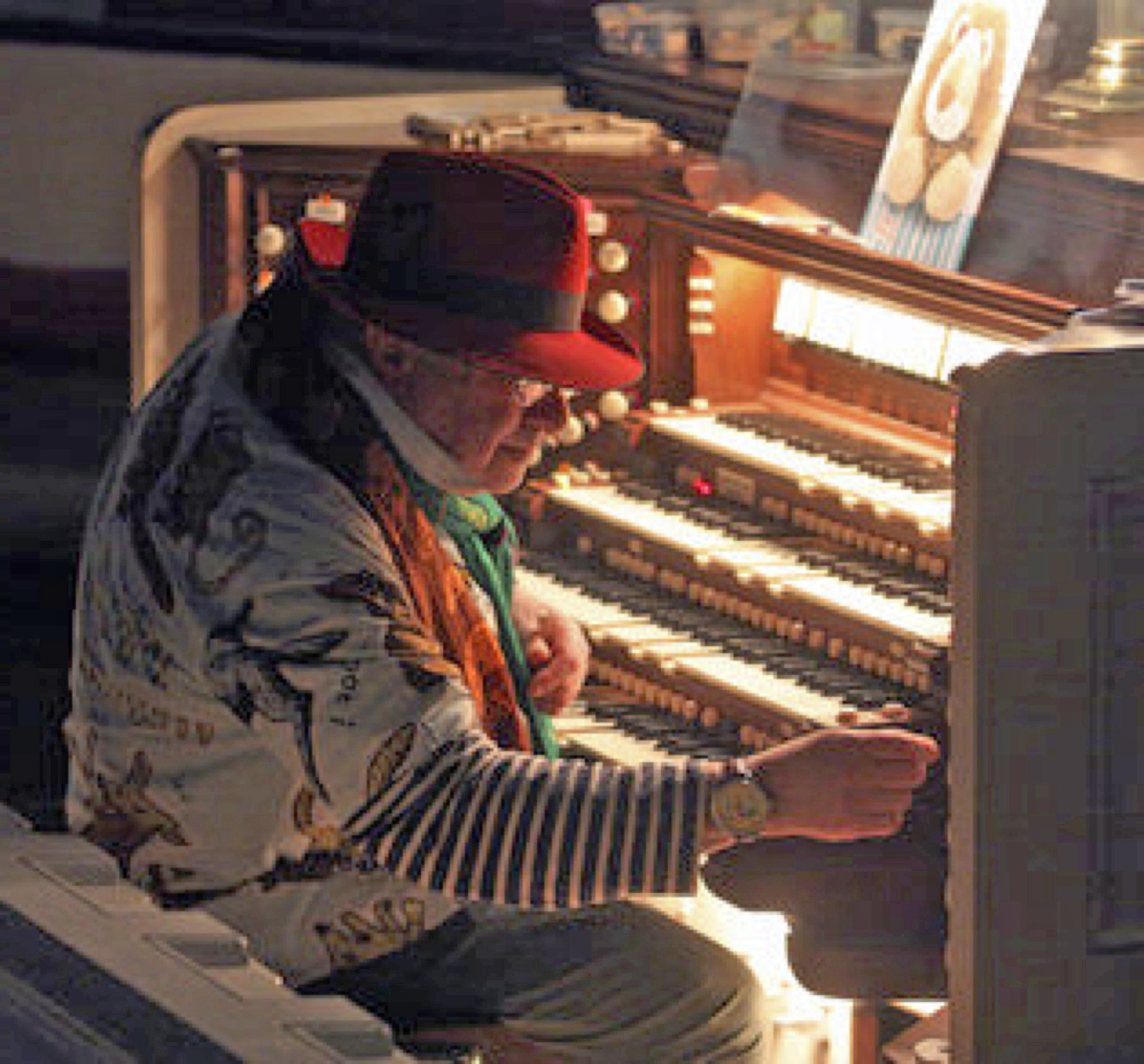
Charlemagne Palestine at Plymouth in 2014

Throughout its history, Plymouth Church has hosted numerous prominent speakers and cultural figures, including William Lloyd Garrison, Wendell Phillips, Charles Sumner, John Greenleaf Whittier, Clara Barton, Charles Dickens, Ralph Waldo Emerson, Horace Greeley, William Makepeace Thackeray, and Hillary Clinton. In February 1963, Martin Luther King Jr. delivered a sermon on the American Dream at the church. The church has additionally served as a venue for concerts, including performances by composers Philip Glass and Charlemagne Palestine using its Aeolian-Skinner organ.

In 1934, Plymouth Church merged with the Congregational Church of the Pilgrims, forming the Plymouth Church of the Pilgrims. The Congregational Church of the Pilgrims vacated its building, designed by Richard Upjohn, which later became the Our Lady of Lebanon Maronite Cathedral and a designated New York City Landmark. Stained-glass windows from the original Pilgrims church, including works by Louis Comfort Tiffany and Tiffany Studios, were installed in Plymouth Church's Hillis Hall. The church also houses a 40-pound (18 kg) fragment of Plymouth Rock.

In 1958, following the 1957 merger of the Congregational Christian Churches with the Evangelical and Reformed Church to form the United Church of Christ, Plymouth Church of the Pilgrims voted not to join the newly formed denomination. The church is currently affiliated with the National Association of Congregational Christian Churches. In September 2011, it returned to its original name, "Plymouth Church". The congregation presently consists of approximately 425 members.

In 2016, Rev. Brett Younger became the 11th settled senior minister in the church’s history, succeeding Rev. David C. Fisher, who retired in September 2013 after leading the Plymouth congregation for 9 years.

== Architecture ==
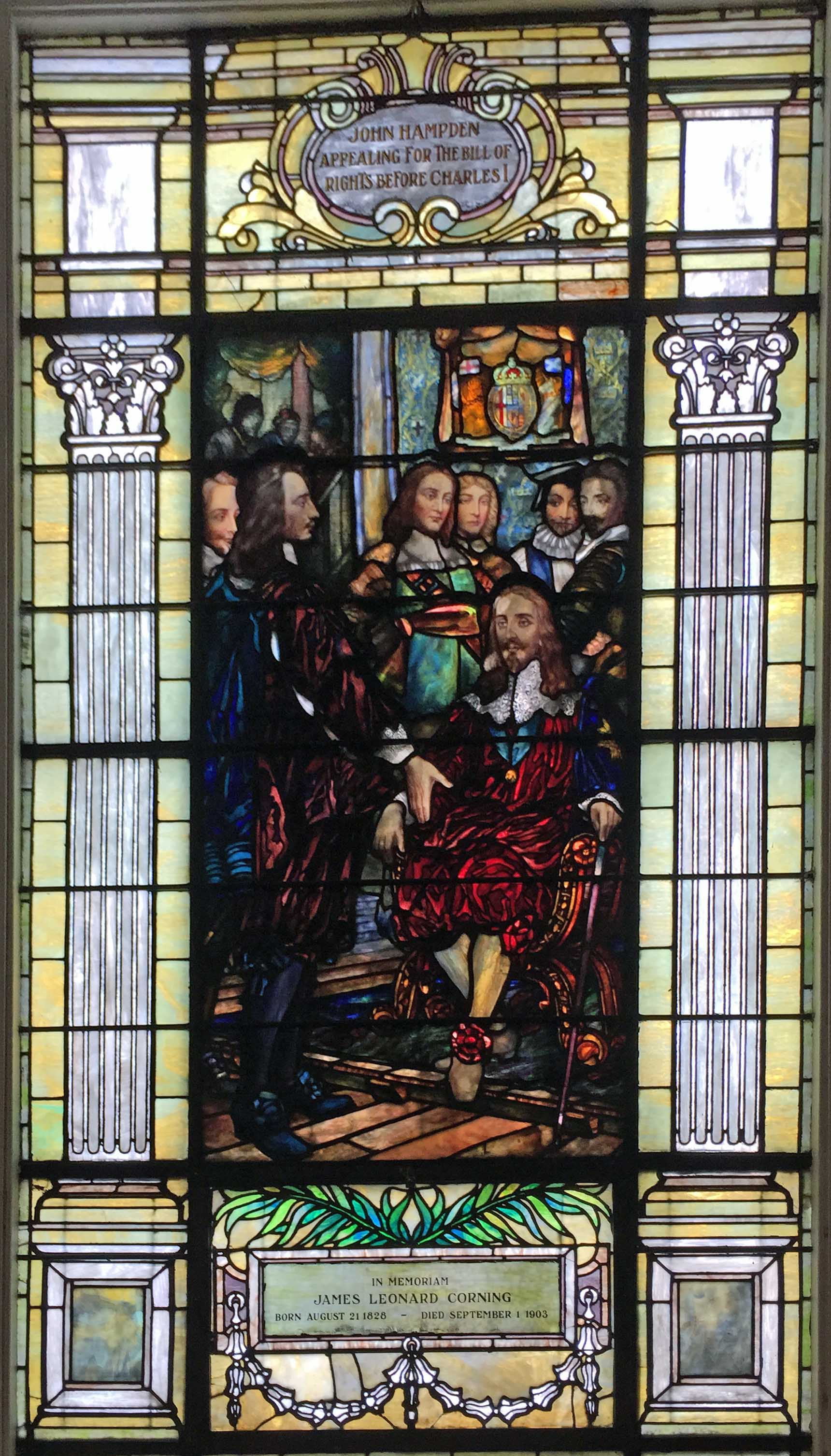
Photo of the first J&R-Lamb-Studios window installed at Plymouth Church (1907). It depicts the scene of John Hampden appealing for the Bill of Rights before Charles I.

Built in 1849–50, Plymouth Church is an example of 19th century urban tabernacle architecture with italianate and colonial motifs. Its layout, influenced by the Broadway Tabernacle in Manhattan, was designed by Joseph C. Wells – who was later one of the founders of the American Institute of Architects. The barn-like church building, with its pews arranged in an arc before the pulpit, resemble more an auditorium or theater than what had traditionally been considered a church. This open design was adopted by many evangelical Protestant churches throughout the United States in the second half of the 19th century.

In 1866, the church's original pipe organ was replaced by E. and G. G. Hook, which installed what was then the largest organ in the United States, expanded further by Aeolian-Skinner in 1937.

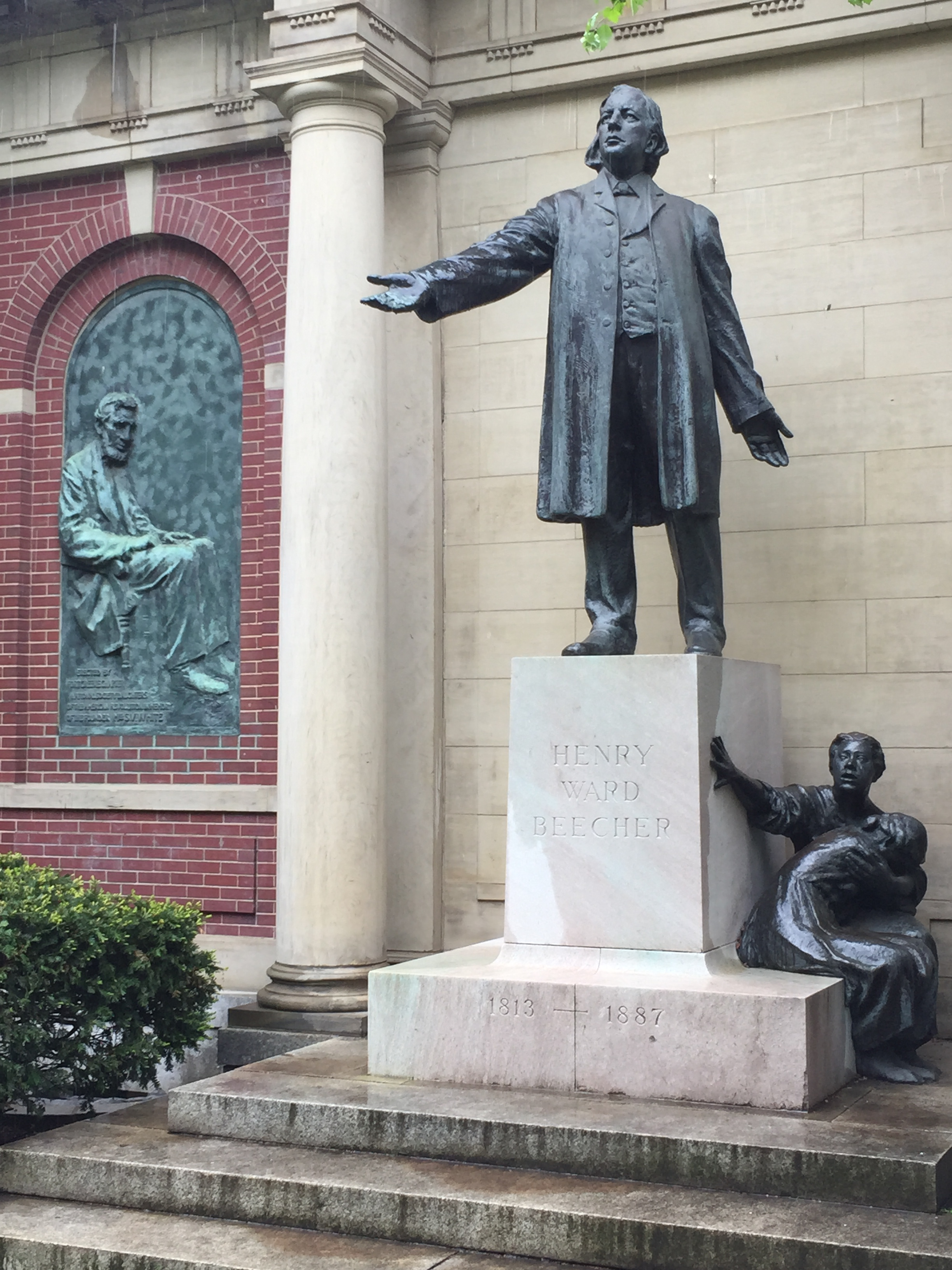
Beecher statue and Lincoln relief by Gutzon Borglum in the church garden.

In 1907–09, the church installed stained-glass windows by the noted J&R Lamb Studios. This studio opened it doors in 1857 and is now the oldest existing studio of its kind in the US. The windows in Plymouth Church are unique in that they do not depict any biblical scenes. Instead they focus on the history of democracy in England and the US, with a particular emphasis on the influence of the Puritans, Pilgrims and Congregational Churches. In 1913 the family of John Arbuckle, a coffee merchant, donated money to create a large garden and the Classic revival parish house. The house and arcade which adjoin the building were designed by Woodruff Leeming.

The church garden, fronting on Orange Street and located between the Church House and the Sanctuary, contains a statue of Beecher and a bas-relief of Lincoln. Both were produced by famed sculptor Gutzon Borglum, who later created the Mount Rushmore National Memorial. An almost identical statue of Beecher is located less than a mile away, next to Cadman Plaza, in front of Brooklyn's historic Federal Building and Post Office.

The church was became a National Historic Landmark on July 4, 1961, and added to the National Register of Historic Places on October 15, 1966. It is located within the Brooklyn Heights Historic District, which was created by the New York City Landmarks Preservation Commission on November 23, 1965, and which was designated a National Historic Landmark District that year.

Tours of the church, including its grounds, the Sanctuary, Hillis Hall, and the original Underground Railroad facilities, are available upon request. From 2000 to 2015, these tours were given by Lois Rosebrooks, the long-time director of history ministry services.

== See also ==
- List of Underground Railroad sites
- List of National Historic Landmarks in New York City
- National Register of Historic Places listings in Brooklyn
