= Lewis B. Sturges =

American politician

Member of the U.S. House of Representatives from Connecticut's at-large congressional district
- In office September 16, 1805 – March 4, 1817
- Preceded by: Calvin Goddard
- Succeeded by: Samuel B. Sherwood

Personal details
- Born: March 15, 1763 Fairfield, Connecticut, U.S.
- Died: March 30, 1844 (aged 81) Norwalk, Ohio, U.S.
- Relations: Oliver Sturges (brother); Jonathan Sturges (nephew)
- Parent(s): Jonathan Sturges; Deborah Lewis Sturges
- Education: Yale College

Lewis Burr Sturges (March 15, 1763 – March 30, 1844) was a member of the U.S. House of Representatives from Connecticut from 1805 to 1817. He was born in Fairfield, Connecticut, the son of Jonathan Sturges, who also served in the House.

== Early life ==
Sturges was born in Fairfield, Connecticut, on March 15, 1763. He was a son of Jonathan Sturges and Deborah (née Lewis) Sturges. His siblings included Oliver Sturges, Jonathan Sturges, Barnabas Lothrop Sturges and Priscilla Sturges.

His paternal grandparents were surveyor Samuel Sturges and, his second wife, Ann (née Burr) Sturges. Through his brother Barnabas Lothrop Sturges, he was uncle to prominent businessman Jonathan Sturges.

Sturges graduated from Yale College in 1782, engaged in mercantile pursuits in New Haven, and returned to Fairfield, Conn., in 1786.

== Career ==
He served as clerk of the probate court for the district of Fairfield from 1787 to 1791, and was a member of the State house of representatives from 1794 to 1803. Sturges was elected as a Federalist to the Ninth Congress to fill in part the vacancies caused by the resignations of Calvin Goddard and Roger Griswold. He was reelected to the Tenth and to the four succeeding Congresses and served from September 16, 1805, to March 3, 1817. He later moved to Norwalk, Ohio, where he died in 1844.

== Personal life ==
Stuges was married to Kezia Taylor Stiles (1760–1785), a daughter of Rev. Ezra Stiles and Elizabeth (née Hubbard) Stiles, in 1784. After her death in 1785, he married Charlotte Sturges (1771–1837).

Sturges died in Norwalk, Ohio, on March 30, 1844, and was buried in St. Paul’s Episcopal Churchyard there.

U.S. House of Representatives
Preceded by Calvin Goddard	Member of the U.S. House of Representatives from Connecticut's at-large congressional district 1805–1817	Succeeded by Samuel B. Sherwood
