= Oliver Sturges =

American businessman (1777–1824)

- Born: 1777; Fairfield County, Connecticut, U.S.
- Died: November 27, 1824 (aged 47); Savannah, Georgia, U.S.
- Occupation: businessman
- Parent(s): Jonathan Sturges and Deborah Lewis
- Relatives: Lewis B. Sturges (brother)

Oliver Sturges (1777 – November 27, 1824) was an American businessman based in Savannah, Georgia. He became one of the owners of the SS Savannah, which was the first steamship to cross the Atlantic Ocean.

== Early life ==
Sturges was born in Fairfield County, Connecticut, in 1777 to the Honorable Jonathan Sturges L.L.D. and Deborah Lewis. His brother, Lewis, was a member of the U.S. House of Representatives from 1805 to 1817.

== Career ==
In 1806, Sturges served under Savannah mayor John Noel. He resigned early in the new year of 1807, possibly after having become president of the U.S. Bank in Savannah.

In 1818, Sturges became one of the owners of the SS Savannah, which was the first steamship to cross the Atlantic Ocean. It was wrecked off Long Island, New York, in 1821.

Sturges suffered greatly during the Panic of 1819 and did not recover.

== Personal life ==
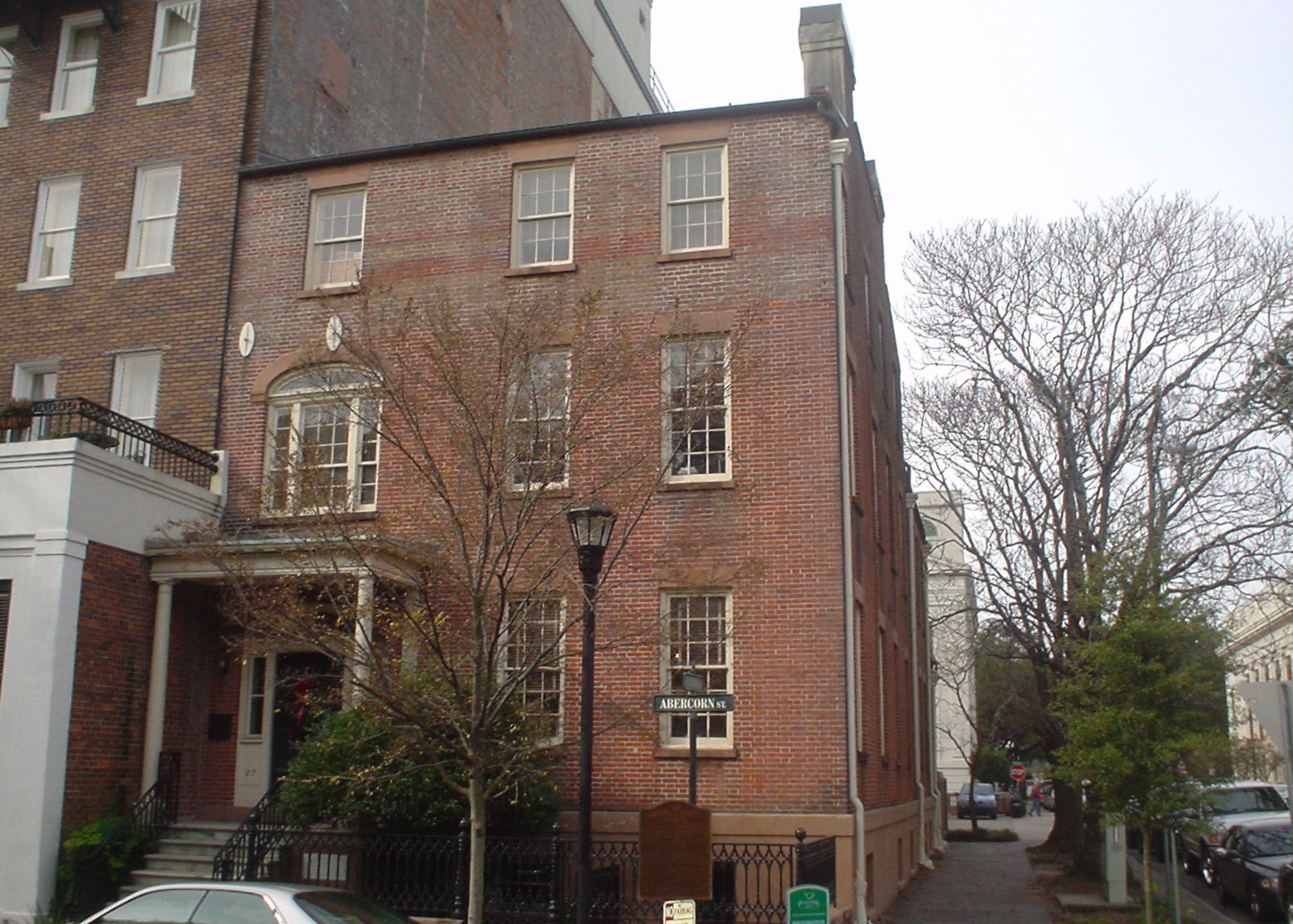
Oliver Sturges House, which had a third storey added in 1835

Sturges married Eliza Neil in 1802, the year they moved south to Augusta, Georgia, firstly, then Savannah. There, Sturges established himself as a merchant. He worked for the firm Harris-Burroughs. After the death of Harris, Benjamin Burroughs made Sturges his partner. Sturges also began to serve in the city's government.

Sturges and his wife had a daughter, Elizabeth, around ten months into their marriage. She married William P. Hunter. A second daughter, Lucretia, followed in 1808. Both girls attended the Moravian Seminary for Young Ladies in Bethlehem, Pennsylvania. They also had a son, Benjamin.

In 1813, he had built what is today known as the Oliver Sturges House on Abercorn Street in Savannah's Reynolds Square. He moved there from a home on St. James Square (later Telfair Square). The voyage of the Savannah was planned at the Reynolds Square home. Partner Burroughs lived in the other residence which formerly occupied the lower part of the square's southwestern trust lot, later occupied by the John Wesley Hotel and Planters Inn.

== Death ==
Sturges died in 1824, aged 47, with the cause of death being given as dropsy. He was interred in Savannah's Colonial Park Cemetery.
