= Samuel B. Sherwood =

American politician

Member of the U.S. House of Representatives from Connecticut's at-large district
- In office March 4, 1817 – March 3, 1819
- Preceded by: Lewis B. Sturges
- Succeeded by: Elisha Phelps

Member of the Connecticut Senate
- In office 1816–1816

Member of the Connecticut House of Representatives
- In office 1809–1815

Personal details
- Born: Samuel Burr Sherwood; November 26, 1767 Weston, Province of Connecticut,
- Died: April 27, 1833 (aged 65) Westport, Connecticut, U.S.
- Resting place: Evergreen Cemetery
- Party: Federalist
- Education: Yale College

Samuel Burr Sherwood (November 26, 1767 – April 27, 1833) was a U.S. representative from Connecticut.

He was born in Northfield Society (later Weston), Connecticut. Sherwood graduated from Yale College in 1786. He studied law, was admitted to the bar, and began practice in that part of Fairfield which is now Westport, Connecticut.

He served as member of the state House of Representatives from 1809 until 1815 and in the state Senate in 1816.

Sherwood was elected as a Federalist to the Fifteenth Congress (March 4, 1817 – March 3, 1819).

He resumed the practice of his profession until 1831, when he retired from professional life. He died in Westport on April 27, 1833, and was interred in Evergreen Cemetery.

U.S. House of Representatives
Preceded by Lewis B. Sturges	Member of the U.S. House of Representatives from Connecticut's at-large congressional district 1817-1819	Succeeded by Elisha Phelps
