= First Presbyterian Church (Manhattan) =

Church in Manhattan, New York

First Presbyterian Church in the City of New York
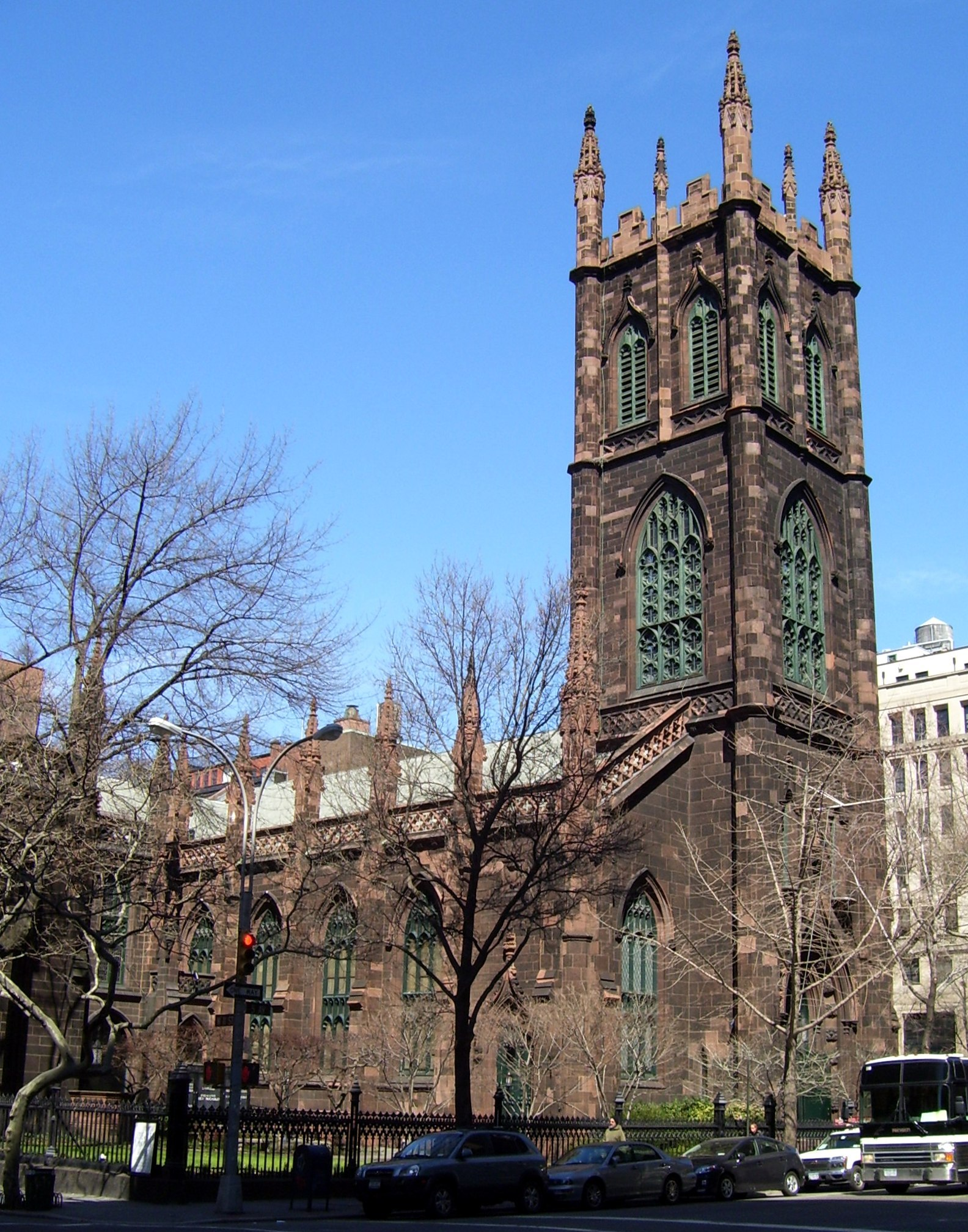
- The First Presbyterian Church in 2011, seen from the south down Fifth Avenue
- First Presbyterian Church in the City of New York
- 40°44′04″N 73°59′42″W
- Location: Manhattan, New York City
- Country: United States
- Language: English
- Denomination: Presbyterian Church (USA)
- Website: fpcnyc.org

History
- Founded: 1716
- Dedicated: 1719

Architecture
- Functional status: Active

The First Presbyterian Church, known as "Old First", is a church located at 48 Fifth Avenue between West 11th and 12th Streets in the Greenwich Village neighborhood of Manhattan, New York City. It was built in 1844–1846, and designed by Joseph C. Wells in the Gothic Revival style. The south transept of the building was added in 1893–1894, and was designed by the firm of McKim, Mead & White. The church complex, which includes a parish house – now referred to as the "South Wing" – on West 11th Street and a church house on West 12th Street designed by Edgar Tafel, is located within the Greenwich Village Historic District.

== History of the congregation ==
=== Wall Street ===
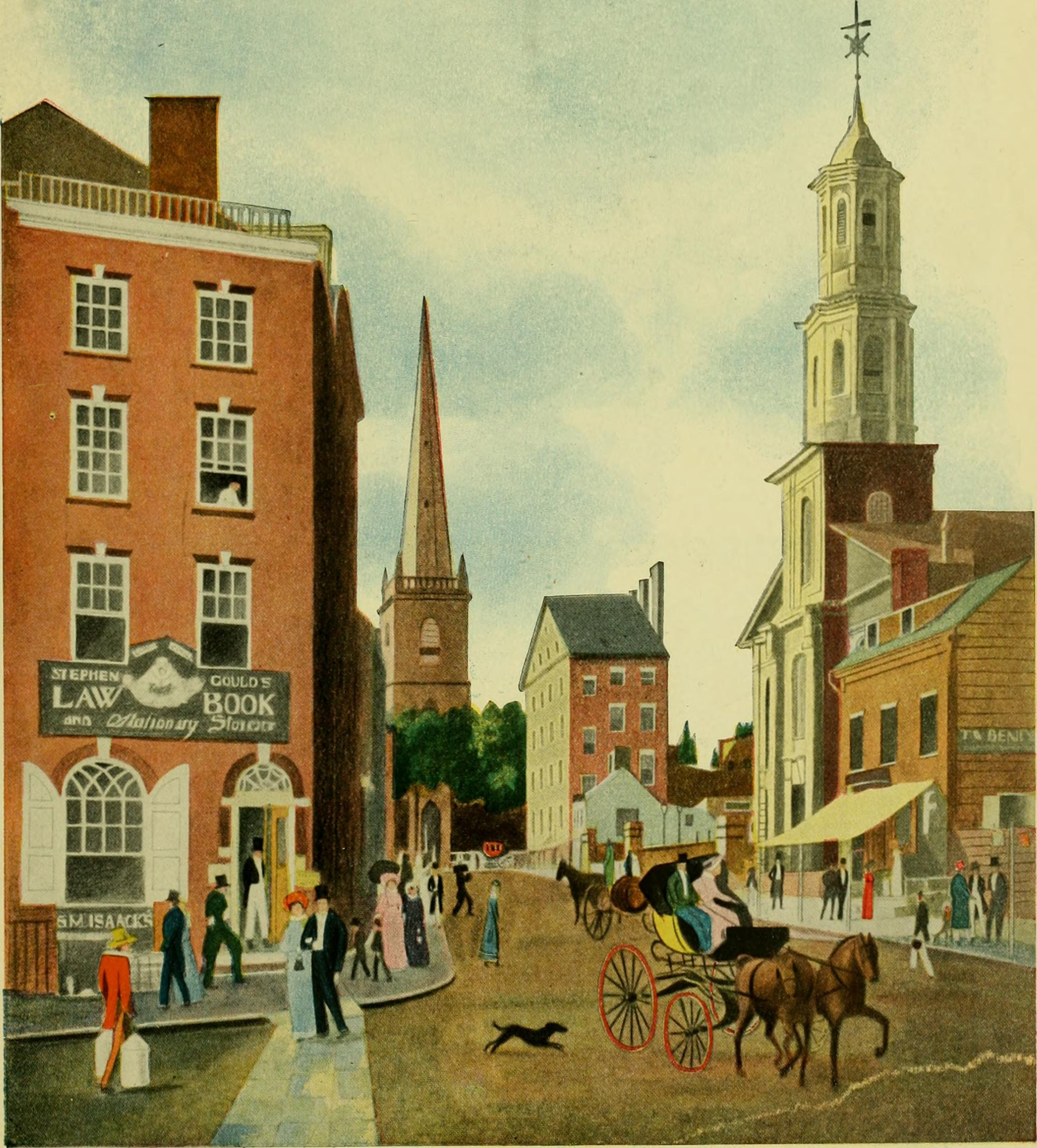
Wall Street in 1825. First Presbyterian is on the right.

The First Presbyterian Church in the City of New York was founded in 1716, and held its first services in 1719 at its sanctuary at 10 Wall Street between Broadway and Nassau Street. This building was rebuilt twice, in 1748 and 1810, and was subsequently taken down and put up again in Jersey City, New Jersey. During its time in its original downtown location, the church spun off a number of congregations to elsewhere in Manhattan, including Brick Presbyterian in 1767, Rutgers Presbyterian in 1798, and Cedar Street Presbyterian in 1808. The latter went on to become the Fifth Avenue Presbyterian Church.

First Presbyterian's original pastor was James Anderson, who had been preaching in New York to the small-but-growing Scots population, whose influence increased with the appointment of a number of Scotsmen to be Governors of the New York colony. During the American Revolution, the church became known as the "Church of Patriots" due to many from its congregation being involved in the effort against Great Britain. Their dissatisfaction arose partly because the King had consistently refused to issue the Church a charter in 1766 and afterwards, claiming a duty to uphold the exclusive rights of the Church of England, represented in New York by Trinity Church. First Presbyterian's pastor from 1765 to 1811, John Rodgers, had to leave the city during the British occupation because of his activities. Such activities had their consequences: authorities confiscated the church, along with other churches associated with the Patriot movement, as barracks for British troops, stables for their horses, warehouses and prisons.

Later, during the early 19th century, the church took a more conservative approach, being aligned with the "Old School", centered on Princeton Theological Seminary, which disapproved of the revival movement, and did not openly oppose slavery.

=== Fifth Avenue ===
The congregation relocated to its present site in 1846 with the encouragement of James Lenox, one of the richest men in the city, and an elder of the congregation.

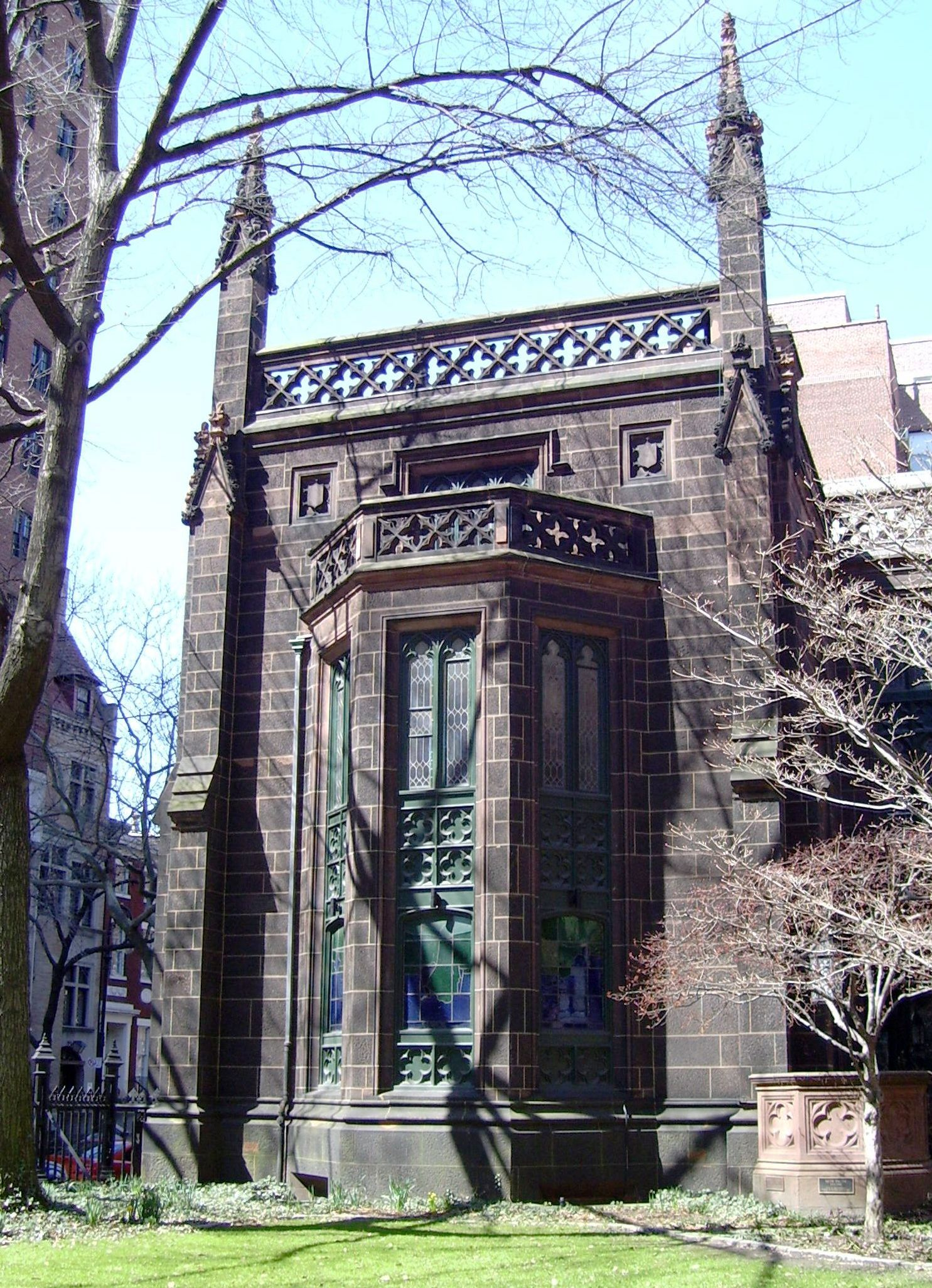
The Fifth Avenue facade of the "South Wing"; the Alexander Chapel is on the ground floor

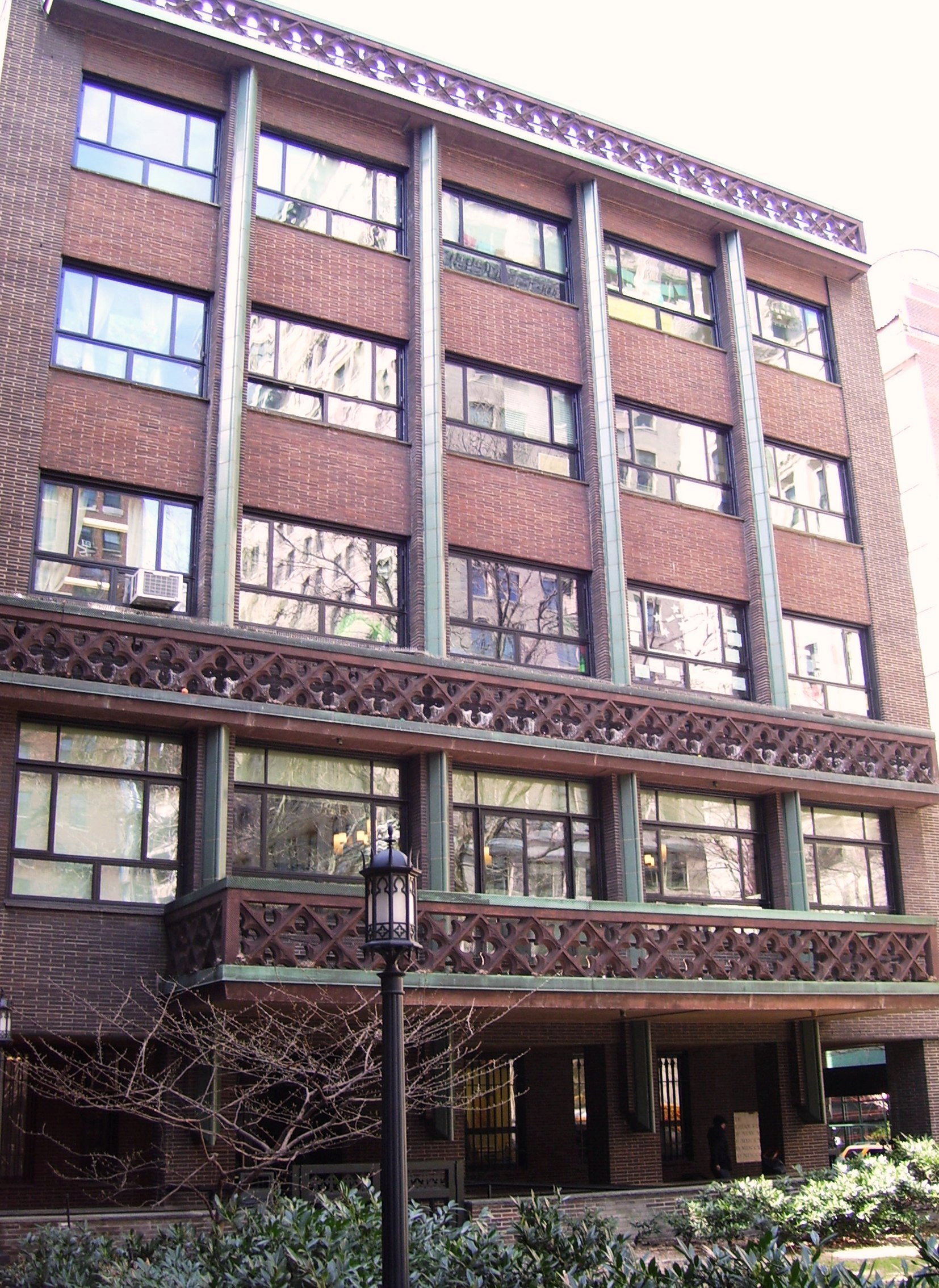
The church house, designed by Edgar Tafel

In 1918, First Presbyterian merged with the Presbyterian churches of Madison Square and University Place, forming what was then known as "“The First Presbyterian Church in the City of New York, Founded 1716 – Old First, University Place and Madison Square Foundation," but referred to colloquially as "New York’s Presbyterian cathedral." That same year, Harry Emerson Fosdick assumed the role of pastor of First Presbyterian Church. Fosdick proved to be a charismatic preacher and resulted in the growth of the congregation. The increased size of the congregation necessitated the lengthening of the church in 1919, with the addition of a chancel. Fosdick's preaching helped the congregation continue to grow: by 1924, it had reached a peak of 1,800 members. Fosdick, however, was also a proponent of liberal Christianity, and it was from the pulpit of First Presbyterian that Fosdick delivered a sermon entitled "Shall the Fundamentalists Win?" on May 21, 1922. The sermon proved to be the opening salvo of what would be referred to as the "Fundamentalist–Modernist Controversy." Fosdick's sermon would eventually cost him his job and he would go on to pastor an American Baptist congregation and then, the famed Riverside Church.

== Buildings and architecture ==
The English-born architect, Joseph C. Wells, based the sanctuary after the Church of St. Saviour in Bath, England, but for the tower used Magdalen Tower, Oxford, as a model. Beginning in 1893, the same year that McKim, Mead and White began construction of the church's south transept, the church installed stained glass windows by Louis Comfort Tiffany, Francis Lathrop, D. Maitland Armstrong and Charles Lamb. These were restored in 1988. With the addition of the chancel and its new stained blue glass rose window in 1919, the reredos, originally painted by Taber Sears in 1917, was moved to the new chancel's western wall, and was repainted.

The church complex, which is surrounded by a fence, partly of wood and partly of cast-iron, also includes a stone Gothic Revival parish house or "South Wing" at 7 West 11th Street, which includes the Alexander Chapel added in 1937, with stained glass windows on Scottish themes. The interiors of the rooms in the South Wing were significantly renovated and remodeled in the 1990s, and many of the rooms are available for rental. On the north side of the complex is the Church House at 12 West 12th Street, the Mellin Macnab Building, built in 1958–60, and designed by Edgar Tafel, who apprenticed under Frank Lloyd Wright. Tafel's design combined Prairie School influences with the Gothic style of the sanctuary, and has been called "a fine example of contemporary design ... used intelligently, to bring a much needed contemporary building into harmony with a neighborhood." Tafel's design won an award from the Fifth Avenue Association.

== Music ==
The church commissioned two pipe organs from organ-builder Sebastian M. Glück. The smaller of the two instruments, known as the Rees Jones Memorial Pipe Organ, is in the Georgian English style and was installed in Alexander Chapel in 2003. The mammoth IV-manual, 93-rank sanctuary organ was completed in 2009. It is a comprehensive symphonic instrument that also incorporates elements from historic schools of organbuilding, notably its "Werck" division based upon a 32' Quintadehn, and its high-pressure Tuba division. The organs are used for recitals, teaching and oratorios with orchestra, in addition to their regular use for church services.

Contralto Amy Ellerman, known for her recording career with Thomas Edison, was employed as a singer at the church for twenty-six years during the first half of the twentieth century.
