= Joseph C. Wells =

American architect

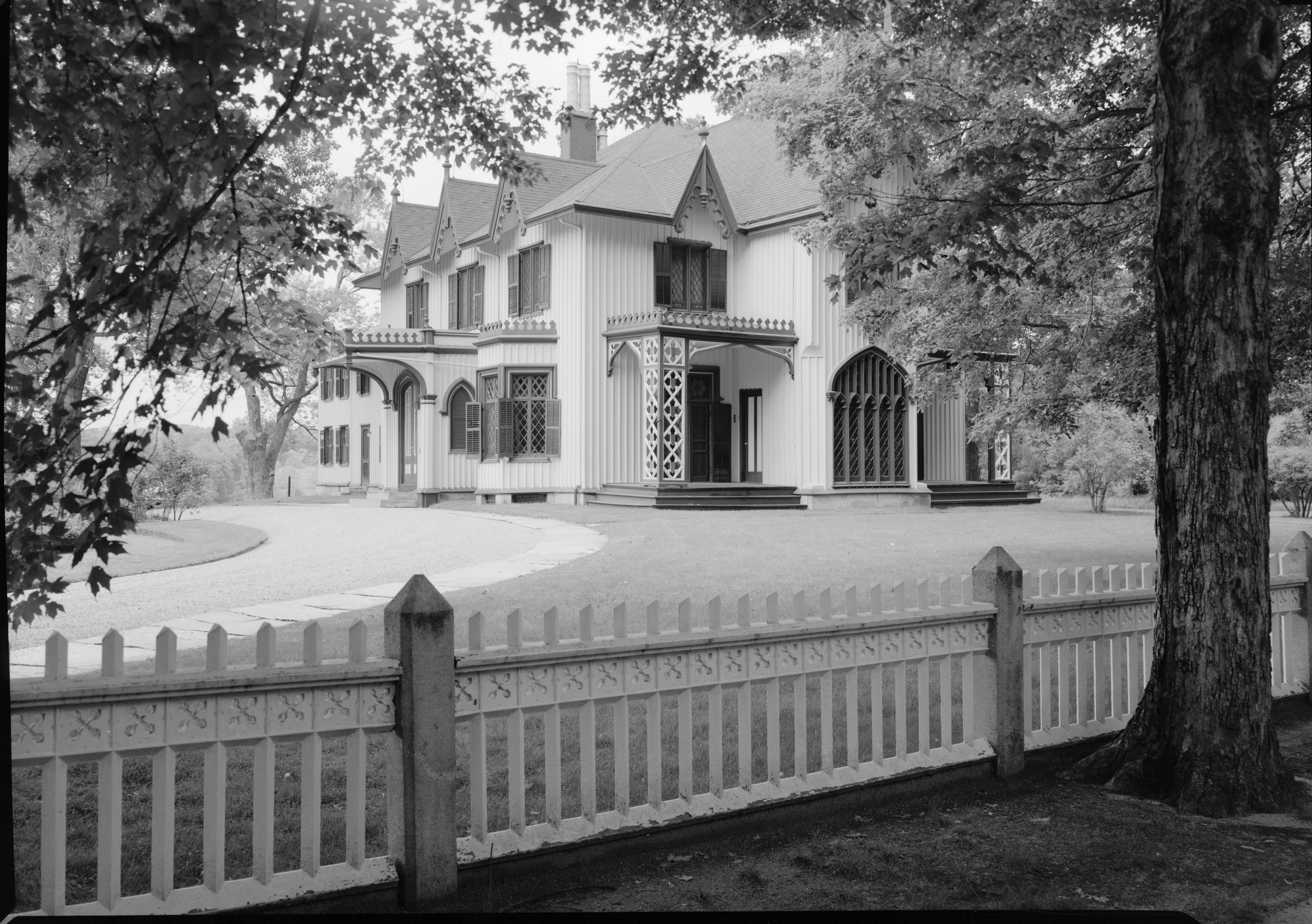
Henry C. Bowen House

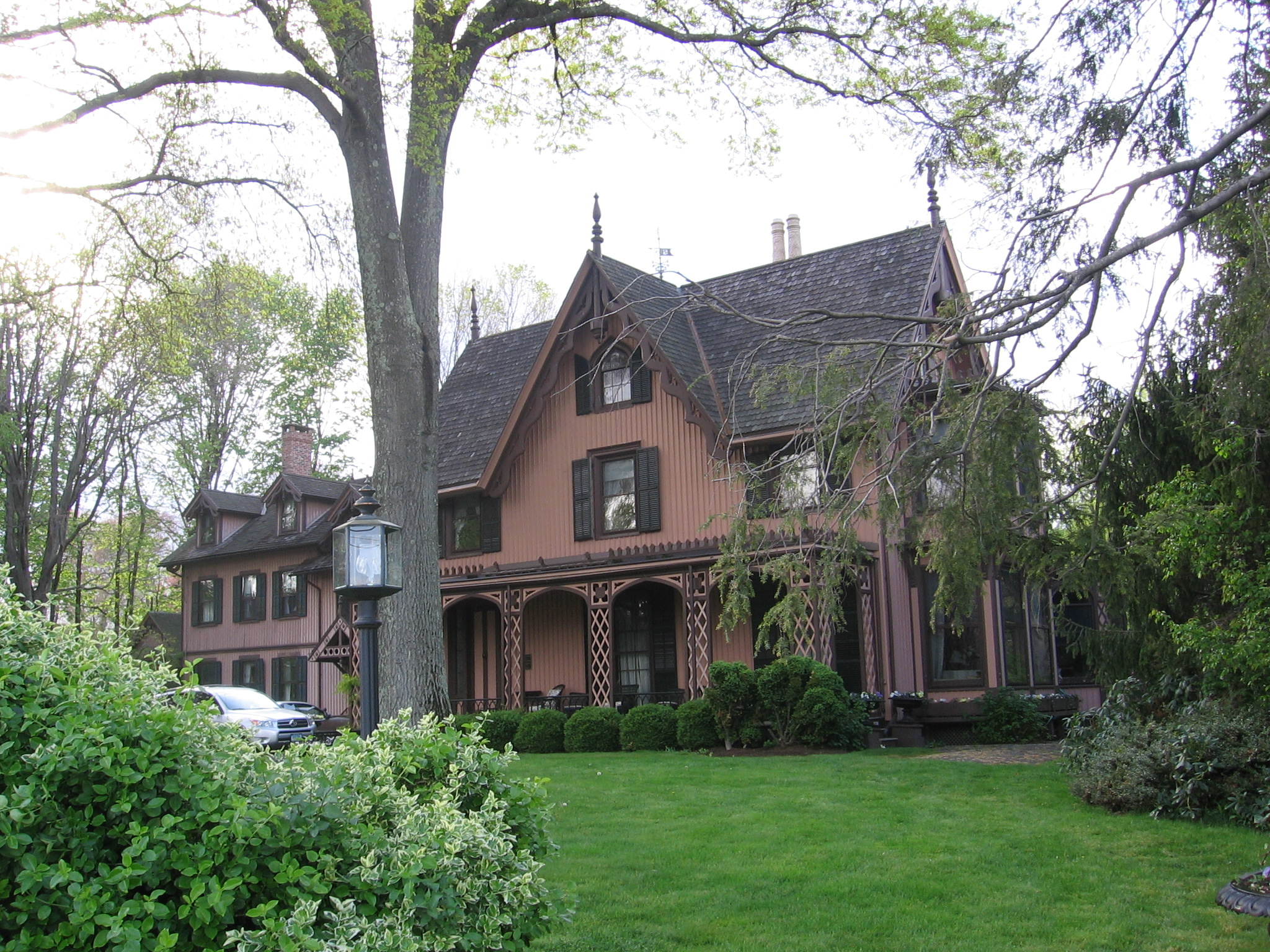
Jonathan Sturges House

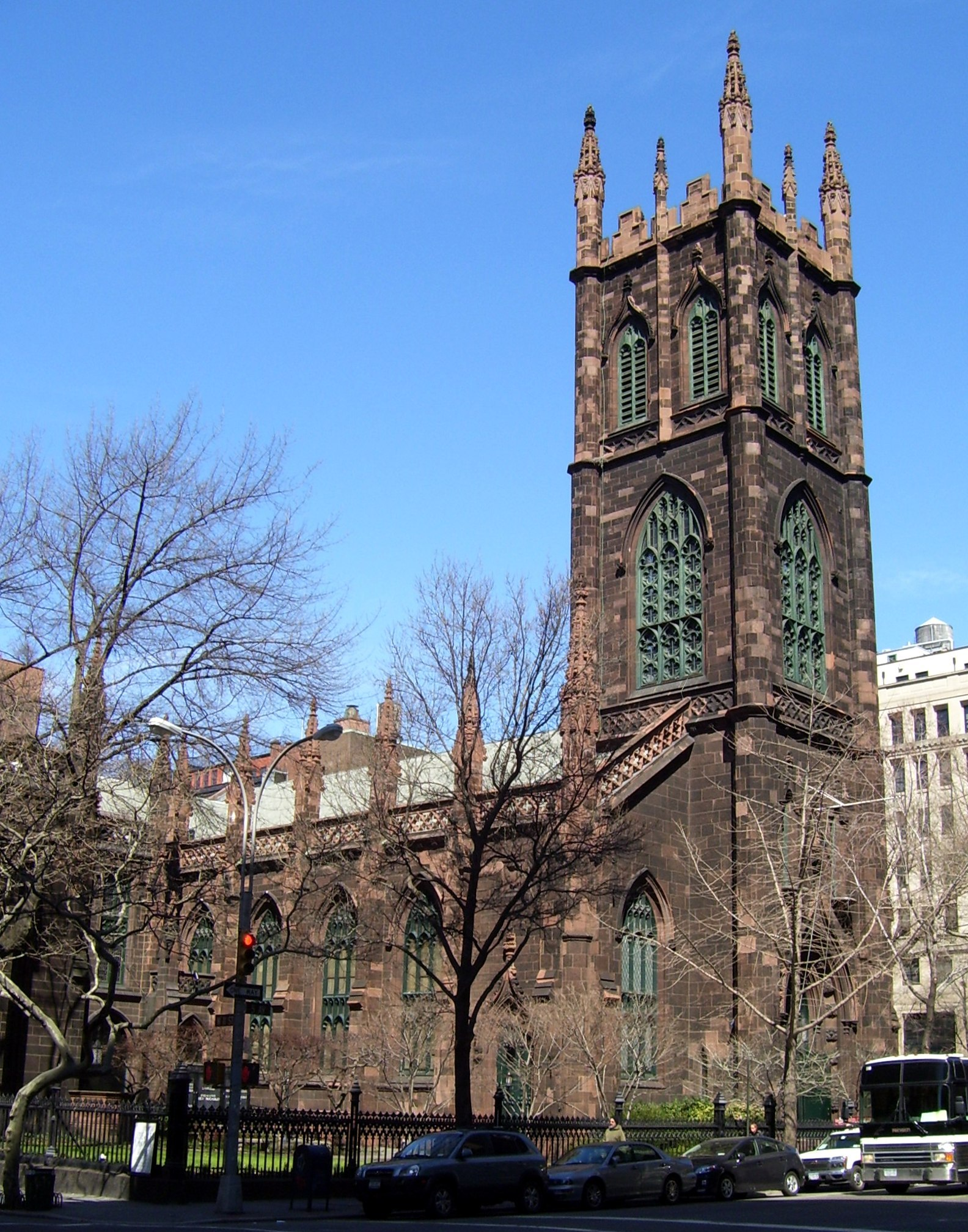
"Old First" in Greenwich Village

Joseph Collins Wells (1814–1860) was an English-born architect who practiced in New York City from 1839 to 1860. He was a founding member of the American Institute of Architects, and several of his works have been listed on the National Register of Historic Places. Two of his works, the Henry C. Bowen House and the Jonathan Sturges House, have been designated as U.S. National Historic Landmarks. He also designed First Presbyterian Church ("Old First"), a New York City Landmark in Greenwich Village.

== Life and career ==
Wells was born in England in 1814 and emigrated to the United States in 1839. His first known work in the United States is the Jonathan Sturges House in Connecticut. By 1840, Wells had formed a partnership with architect William Ranlett in New York City; that partnership lasted one year. Wells has been credited with designing some of "the earliest Gothic Revival cottages in this country", a style later popularized by Andrew Jackson Downing.

In February 1857, Wells was one of 13 architects who met to form an organization to "promote the scientific and practical perfection of its members" and "elevate the standing of the profession." The organization became the American Institute of Architects. Others at that meeting included Richard Morris Hunt, Charles Babcock, Richard Upjohn, his son Richard Mitchell Upjohn and Leopold Eidlitz.

A number of his works are listed on the National Register of Historic Places, and two, the Henry C. Bowen House and the Jonathan Sturges House, are U.S. National Historic Landmarks.

== Works ==
Wells' works include:

- Former Century Association Building, 1857 renovation and extension by Wells, 111 East 15th St, Manhattan, New York City.
- First Presbyterian Church (1846), also known as "Old First," 48 Fifth Avenue, Greenwich Village, New York, New York, designated a New York City Landmark. Wells designed the original 1846 structure.
- Luzerne County Courthouse (1856, former), Wilkes-Barre, Pennsylvania
- E. B. Morgan House, 431 Main Street, Aurora, New York, part of the NRHP-listed Aurora Village–Wells College Historic District
- Plymouth Church of the Pilgrims (1849–1850), 75 Hicks Street, New York, New York (Wells, J. C.), NRHP-listed
- The Reef (built 1852–1853, burned 1942), also known as Sea-Cliffe and the Christopher Wolfe House, 562 Bellevue Avenue, Newport, Rhode Island
- Roseland Cottage, also known as Henry C. Bowen House, CT 169, Woodstock, Connecticut (Wells, Joseph Collins), NRHP-listed
- Store-and-loft building at 47 Murray Street (c. 1855), 47 Murray Street, Manhattan, New York, New York (attributed to Joseph C. Wells)
- Jonathan Sturges House, 449 Mill Plain Road, Fairfield, Connecticut (Wells, Joseph Collins), NRHP-listed
- United Congregational Church, Spring and Pelham Streets, Newport, Rhode Island (Wells, Joseph C.), NRHP-listed

The Villard Houses are sometimes misattributed to Wells, but they were in fact built more than 20 years after he died, and were actually designed by Joseph Morrill Wells (1853–1890) of the McKim, Mead & White firm.
