= Jonathan Sturges =

American politician

Member of the U.S. House of Representatives from Connecticut's at-large district
- In office March 4, 1789 – March 3, 1793
- Preceded by: Roger Sherman
- Succeeded by: Jonathan Trumbull, Jr.

Personal details
- Born: August 23, 1740 Fairfield, Connecticut Colony, British America
- Died: October 4, 1819 (aged 79) Fairfield, Connecticut, U.S.
- Party: Pro-Administration Party
- Spouse: Deborah Lewis Sturges
- Children: At least 5, including Lewis Burr Sturges and Oliver Sturges
- Education: Yale College
- Occupation: Lawyer, Jurist, Politician

Jonathan Sturges (August 23, 1740 – October 4, 1819) was an American lawyer, jurist and politician from Fairfield, Connecticut. He represented Connecticut as a delegate to the Continental Congress and in the United States House of Representatives.

== Early life ==
Sturges was born in Fairfield in the Connecticut Colony where his father, Samuel (1712–1771), was a surveyor. His mother, Ann (Burr) Sturges was Samuel's second wife. His great-great-grandfather, also Jonathan Sturges (1624–1700), was one of the original settlers of the town.

Sturges graduated from Yale in 1759. He earned his master's degree from Yale in 1761, and his Doctor of Laws degree from Yale in 1806. He read law, and was admitted to the bar in May 1772. He began the practice of law in Fairfield.

== Career ==
Sturges' entry into public service came when his neighbors in Fairfield sent him to the Connecticut House of Representatives in 1772. He was returned every year until 1784. In 1773 he served Fairfield County as a justice of the peace, and in 1775 he served as the judge of probate court. Connecticut sent him as a delegate to the Continental Congress in 1786. He served as a member of the Connecticut Council of Assistants from 1786 to 1788, and simultaneously served as a judge of the Connecticut Supreme Court of Errors from 1786 to 1789.

When the new United States government was formed, the voters elected him to the U.S. House as a Pro-Administration Party candidate. He served two terms in Congress from March 4, 1789, to March 3, 1793. Sturges was one of seven representatives to vote against the Fugitive Slave Act of 1793.

Upon returning home, he was appointed an Associate Justice of the Connecticut Supreme Court, serving from 1793 until 1805. He was a presidential elector in 1797 and 1805.

Sturges died at his home in Fairfield on October 4, 1819.

== Personal life ==
In 1760 Sturges married Deborah Lewis. They had at least five children together, including Oliver. Another son, Lewis, followed his father in the U.S. Congress.

Jonathan Sturges, an important arts patron in New York City, was his grandson.

U.S. House of Representatives
Preceded by District created	Member of the U.S. House of Representatives from Connecticut's at-large congressional district 1789–1793	Succeeded by Joshua Coit
