= Woodstock Hill Historic District =

Historic district in Connecticut, United States

- U.S. National Register of Historic Places
- U.S. Historic district
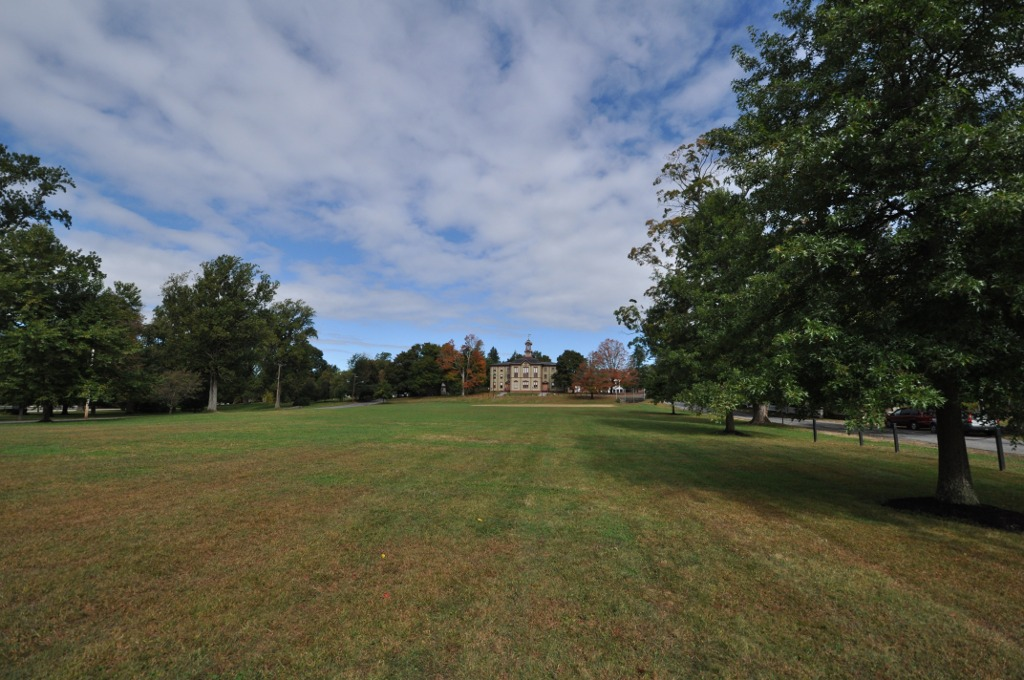
- View up the village green to the academy

- Location within Connecticut Location within the United States
- Location: Roughly along Plaine Hill Road, and Academy Road, including parts of Old Hall Road and Child Hill Road, Woodstock, Connecticut
- Coordinates: 41°57′4″N 71°58′32″W
- Area: 100 acres (40 ha)
- Architect: Wells, Joseph Collins; Alexander S. Cutler, et al.
- Architectural style: Colonial, Federal, Greek Revival
- NRHP reference No.: 98001578
- Added to NRHP: January 6, 1999

The Woodstock Hill Historic District is a historic district encompassing the historic village center of Woodstock, Connecticut. It is centered on the Woodstock Green, extending South from there toward the Junction of Connecticut Route 169 and Plaine Hill Road. Major buildings in the district include the 1821 Congregational Church, the buildings of Woodstock Academy (of which its 1873 classroom building stands overlooking Woodstock Green), and Roseland Cottage, a National Historic Landmark that is one of the nation's finest Gothic Revival summer houses. The district was listed on the National Register of Historic Places in 1999.

Woodstock was settled in 1686 by English colonists from Roxbury in the Massachusetts Bay Colony, and was known as New Roxbury until 1690, when it was incorporated as Woodstock. The early settlers occupied the ridge along which Plain Ridge Road now runs, and the area now occupied by the green, Congregational church, and adjacent cemetery were set aside for those purposes by the first arrivals. The present church is the third to stand on the site; the first was completed in 1691. Woodstock Academy was founded in 1802, and the town center benefited from the philanthropy of Henry Chandler Bowen. Bowen was a descendant of one of the town's first settlers, and was a successful New York businessman. He summered at Roseland Cottage, and was a major philanthropic force in the village in the late 19th century, sponsoring elaborate Fourth of July celebrations, and helping fund the 1873 academy building.

== See also ==
- National Register of Historic Places listings in Windham County, Connecticut
