= Woodstock Academy Classroom Building =

- U.S. National Register of Historic Places
- U.S. Historic district – Contributing property
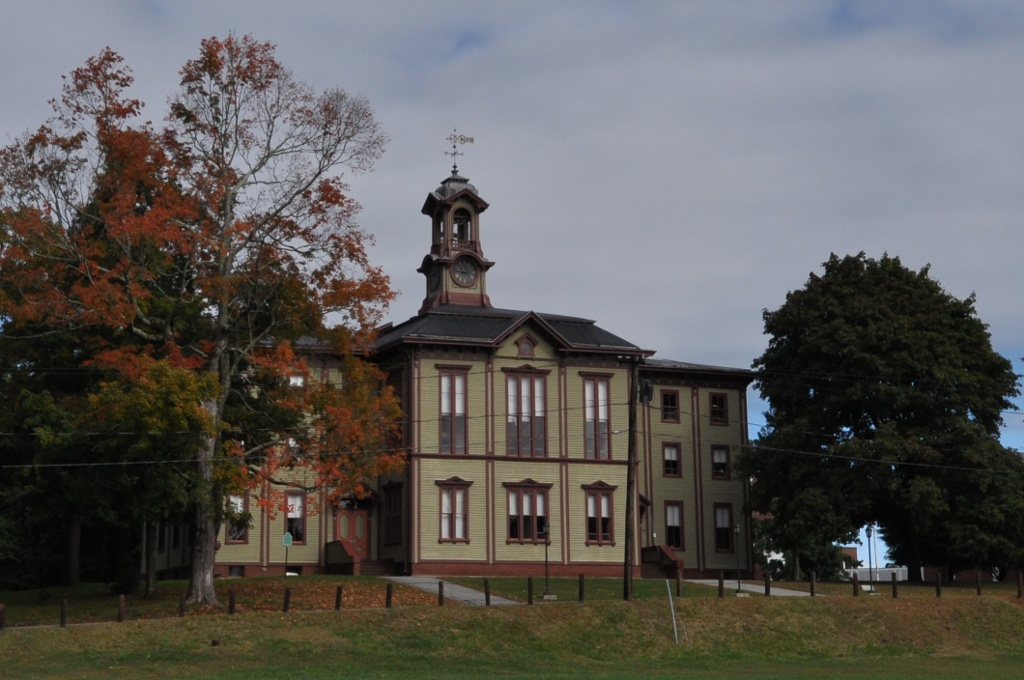

- Location within Connecticut Location within the United States
- Location: 57 Academy Road, Woodstock, Connecticut
- Coordinates: 41.9509°N 71.9753°W
- Area: less than one acre
- Built: 1873
- Architect: A. G. Cutler
- Architectural style: Italianate
- Part of: Woodstock Hill Historic District (ID98001578)
- NRHP reference No.: 84001176

Significant dates
- Added to NRHP: February 16, 1984
- Designated CP: February 16, 1984

The Woodstock Academy Classroom Building is a historic school building on Academy Road in the Woodstock Hill village of Woodstock, Connecticut. Built in 1873, it is the oldest standing building on the campus of the Woodstock Academy, which was founded in 1801, and is a prominent example of Italianate school architecture. The building was listed on the National Register of Historic Places in 1984.

== Description and history ==
The Woodstock Academy Classroom Building is a three-story wood-frame structure that stands impressively on a rise overlooking the Woodstock Green. It is nine bays wide, with the middle three projecting outward, capped by a pedimented gable over the center bay. Window bays are articulated by paneled pilasters, which rise to paired brackets in the eaves. Windows on the projecting section are topped by pedimented and bracketed cornices. The building is topped by a two-stage belltower.

Woodstock Academy, established in 1802, is one of the oldest private schools in Connecticut. Repairs to its first building were supported by Henry Chandler Bowen, whose summer residence, the Roseland Cottage, also faces the Woodstock Green. In 1867 he kicked off a fundraising campaign to build a new classroom building, pledging $5000 to the school's endowment, and another $5000 for building construction, provided that the town and local residents also contributed to the fund. Alexander G. Cutler of Norwich was retained to design the building, which was completed in 1872. The building is the only known academic building in the state to retain significant Italianate features.

== See also ==
- National Register of Historic Places listings in Windham County, Connecticut
