= Warren L. Wheaton =

American politician, college founder (1812–1903)

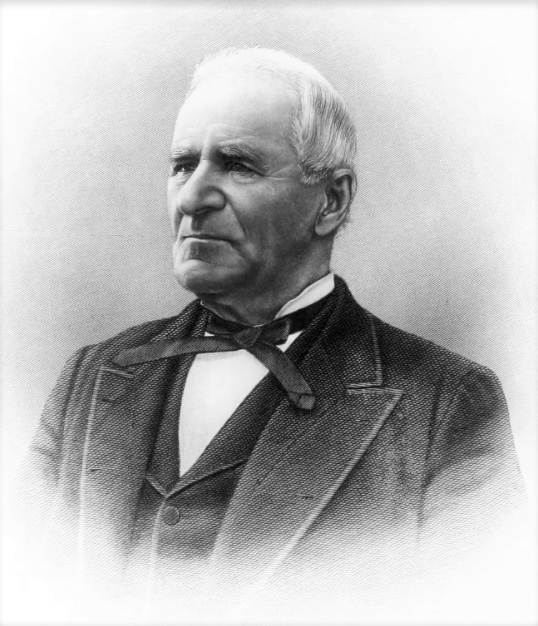
- Born: Warren Lyon Wheaton; March 6, 1812; Pomfret, Connecticut, U.S.
- Died: February 1, 1903 (aged 90); Wheaton, Illinois, U.S.
- Education: Woodstock Academy
- Occupations: Farmer, teacher, legislator, businessman
- Spouses: Harriet E. Rickard (m. 1848; died 1863) Christiana Shugg (m. 1877; died 1899)

Warren Lyon Wheaton (1812–1903) was an American farmer, teacher, legislator, businessman, philanthropist, and benefactor and namesake of Wheaton College and Wheaton, Illinois.

== Early life ==
Warren L. Wheaton was born in Pomfret, Connecticut on March 6, 1812, to James and Nancy Lyon Wheaton, both natives of New England. Wheaton's family was descended from Reformed Baptist Puritans from the United Kingdom, who helped found the First Baptist Church in Massachusetts and who were sympathetic to Roger Williams. Wheaton's grandfather, James Wheaton, lived in Providence, Rhode Island and fought in the Revolutionary War. Warren Wheaton was the eldest of thirteen children. He attended the Woodstock Academy in Woodstock, Connecticut and became a school teacher after attending the academy for a-year-and-a-half. He also served in the local militia.

== Move to West ==
After hearing about the fertile farmland in Illinois from Erastus Gary, Wheaton visited there in 1837 and returned permanently in 1838, followed by his brother, Jesse Childs Wheaton. While staying with Erastus Gary in Illinois, Wheaton experienced a conversion to Christianity, as did his brother, Jesse, and they both eventually became members of the Methodist church. Warren Wheaton then started farming in Du Page County, Illinois after receiving some government land there, laying claim to 640 acres (2.6 km^{2}) of land in the center of town. Jesse Childs Wheaton later made claim to 300 acres (1.2 km^{2}) of land just west of Warren's. Other settlers from New England soon joined the Wheaton settlement. In 1850, ten blocks of land were platted and anyone who was willing to build immediately was granted free land. In 1853, the lots were surveyed and a formal plat for the city was filed with the county. The city was then incorporated in 1859 with Warren serving as its first President.

In 1848, Warren Wheaton married Harriet E. Rickard (1826-1863) of Pomfret, Connecticut and had six children before she died after giving birth to their last child in 1863. Wheaton married a second time, to Christiana Shugg on April 4, 1877, in Manhattan. Christiana Shugg was born on December 31, 1816, and baptised on January 19, 1817, in Helston, Cornwall, England. Her parents were William Shugg (1791-1856), a miller, and Elizabeth Williams (c. 1789 – 1862). The Shugg family emigrated from Cornwall to North America on the ship Margaret Evans, docking on November 21, 1846, at New York City Port. Prior to her marriage, Christiana Shugg was a milliner and business-woman, advertising her shop on Fifth Avenue in The New York Times. After twenty years of marriage, Christiana Wheaton died in 1899. Buried in Wheaton Cemetery, DuPage, Illinois, her gravestone memorial reads: "Christiana Shugg Wheaton 1818-1899". Warren L. Wheaton was later buried beside her. Christiana's obituary (published Friday September 8, 1899) noted "Her parents were members of the Baptist church and reared their children in the habits of prayer and the study of God's word," and "when twenty-three or twenty-four years of age she came to New York where for many years she made her home." ... "she became a great blessing and shared in the cares and labor of her husband for home, church and college."

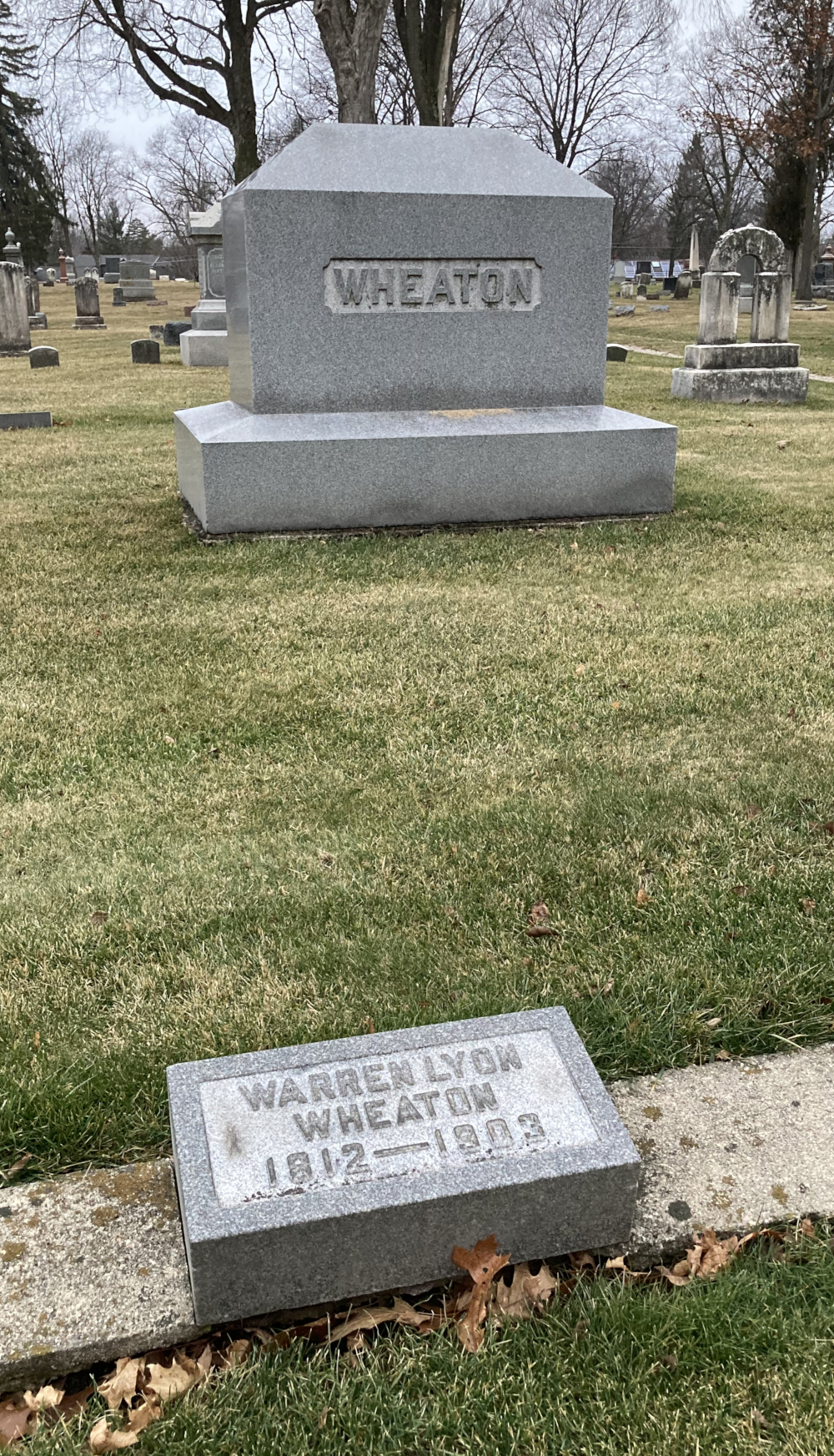
Wheaton's grave at Wheaton Cemetery

Brother Jesse Childs Wheaton (1813-1895), a carpenter, married Orinda Gary (1813-1882), and they operated an Underground Railroad depot on their 300-acre farm, which adjoined Warren's claim. They teamed with Warren Wheaton and his wife Harriet to undertake secret network duties. To conceal runaways, the Wheatons equipped their house with a secret attic-within-an-attic. In addition to laying out the city of Wheaton, they supported an abolitionist Wesleyan church. Jesse Childs Wheaton co-founded Wheaton College, a Quaker institution that also harboured fugitive slaves within the college community.

Warren Lyon Wheaton was elected to the legislature by 1848 as a Democrat and persuaded the railroad to locate through his settlement and encouraged other settlers to locate there.

== Philanthropy ==
He donated land and funds to various churches and civic organizations, including land for a Methodist church, land for a new courthouse, a railroad right-of-way, and large donations of land and cash to Wheaton College, which was named in his honor. He also made large donations to the Aurora Institute, Clark Seminary, and Evanston College. Wheaton also helped form the Mutual Security Company of Wheaton and contributed to the Milwaukee, Galena and Chicago Telegraph Company. A large birthday celebration was held for Wheaton on his ninetieth birthday with students and faculty from Wheaton College presenting gifts. Warren Wheaton died the following year on February 1, 1903, at the age of ninety. He was buried at Wheaton Cemetery.
