= Connecticut's Historic Gardens =

Connecticut's Historic Gardens are eleven historic gardens scattered across the American state of Connecticut.

- Bellamy-Ferriday House and Garden, Bethlehem, Connecticut
- Butler-McCook House and Garden, Hartford, Connecticut
- Florence Griswold Museum, Old Lyme, Connecticut
- Glebe House (Woodbury, Connecticut), Woodbury, Connecticut
- Harkness Memorial State Park, Waterford, Connecticut
- Harriet Beecher Stowe House, Hartford, Connecticut
- Hill-Stead Museum, Farmington, Connecticut
- Osborne Homestead Museum, Derby, Connecticut
- Promisek/Beatrix Farrand Garden at Three Rivers Farm, Bridgewater, Connecticut
- Roseland Cottage, Woodstock, Connecticut
- Webb-Deane-Stevens Museum, Wethersfield, Connecticut
