= Samuel Chandler Paine =

American physician (1807–1888)

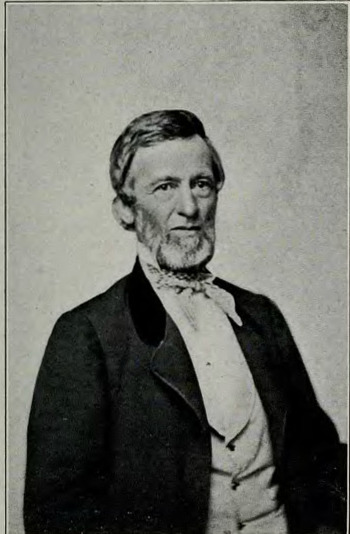
- Born: February 21, 1807; Woodstock
- Died: April 1, 1888
- Education: Yale College
- Occupation: Politician
- Father: John Paine

Samuel Chandler Paine (February 21, 1807 – April 1, 1888) was an American politician and medical doctor. He served in the Massachusetts State Legislature in 1879. Paine practice medicine in Oxford, Massachusetts for nearly sixty years.

== Early life ==
Paine was born February 21, 1807 in Woodstock, Connecticut. His father was John Paine (1776 to 1846), a leading citizen of Woodstock and member of the Connecticut House of Representatives.

Paine graduated with an Bachelor of Arts degreed from Yale College in New Haven, Connecticut in 1828. In 1829, Paine entered Yale School of Medicine, graduating two years later.

== Career ==
After graduating from medical school, Paine started practicing medicine in Oxford, Massachusetts. He continued with that practice for nearly sixty years, until he died.

From 1873 to 1881, Paine was the president of the Oxford National Bank in Oxford. In 1879, Paine served as a representative in the Massachusetts State Legislature.

== Personal life ==
Paine married Abigail Davis on June 18, 1834. She was the daughter of Abigail (née Hall) and Abijah Davis, Esq., of Oxford. She died on December 28, 1886. They had three daughters: Elizabeth Paine, Ellen Agnes Paine, and Lucy Anna Paine (who died in childhood).

Paine was a deacon in the Congregational Church in Oxford.

On December 1, 1887, Paine experienced a slight paralysis, from which he was supposed to have recovered. In March 1888, he had a similar attack. Paine died in Oxford on April 1, 1888.
