= Chris Mark Castle =

Residence near Woodstock, Connecticut, US

Coordinates: 42.0021°N 72.0511°W

Chris Mark Castle, also known as Woodstock Castle, is a residential property on Brickyard Road near Woodstock, Connecticut, finished in 2010 and built in the style of a Gothic castle and named for its builder and owner. Listed for sale several times since 2014, it has set state records for the asking price for a home and received considerable online attention, but has not sold.

== Features ==
The mock castle is in a Neo-Gothic style. The floorspace is alternately listed as 18,777 22,377, and 35,000 sq ft. The castle has a 38m high tower and a moat with a drawbridge set by a lake in grounds of 354 acres in 2008 (though only 75 acres were included in the 2022 sale offer). The main building is 10.6m high due to fire regulations. The wooden floors are emblazoned with a coat of arms and there are frescoed ceilings and stained glass windows. It has 20 rooms, of which eight or nine are bedrooms and seven are bathrooms, an auditorium, cinema, jacuzzi, an underground garage, a walk-out basement apartment, and heated outdoor decks and patios. The Financial Times said "No expense, or whimsy, was spared in the design of this castle".

In 2008, exotic animals such as camels, emus, and a zebra were kept on the grounds. Mark unsuccessfully applied to run a zoo there in 2001 and previously ran an animal refuge in Rehoboth, Massachusetts. One camel died of neglect in 2010.

There were two fires on the grounds in 2023, one burning down a separate 150-year-old house in February and the other in an outbuilding used to store wood and heat water in March, which a fire marshal speculated was due to mice damaging electric cables.

== Ownership ==
The castle was built for Christopher W Mark (born 1962/3), known as Chris, and his family. Mark is an heir to his great-grandfather, the steel industrialist Clayton Mark, and runs a manufacturing and import/export business. He said he wanted to provide a "fairytale childhood" for his two daughters, one of whom, as of 2022, ran the castle's social media accounts with over 300,000 TikTok followers. It was also inspired by their ancestors' castles in Ireland. The girls both modeled for carved faces in the property. Mark remained resident following his divorce in 2013.

== Building ==
The lot was purchased for $167,500 in 2001 or 2003. Ahead of construction, which began in 2003, Mark traveled to Europe for over a year to source materials from old churches and chateaus. Building work took seven years and involved buying a local boatbuilder for the wooden doors and inlaid floors made of imported hardwoods, a local foundry for the wrought iron, and granite from a local quarry. Construction finished in 2009 or 2010 (when it received its certification to be lived in) at a cost of $4.1 million USD.

== Business use ==
During building in 2008, Mark advertised a modeling service via www.castle-models.com at the castle using the name of another company, Global Companies LLC, which local officials objected to because it was not licensed as a business address or residence at the time. The website was taken down. The castle had from 2005-7 been marketed as a showcase for high-end products, also without licensing permission.

A later application, sometime before 2013, for a banquet hall and bed-and-breakfast was refused because the building is above the local non-residential maximum of 35 ft.

The castle appeared in the 2020 Hallmark movie "One Royal Holiday" and in a music video.

In 2023, Mark held filming for a proposed series titled "101 Princesses" at the castle. The son of journalist Jon Ronson accompanied a female friend who had been invited to a party at the castle, where the guests, invited via dating apps, were asked to wear medieval gowns and tuxedos and take part in a reality show for Mark to find his "queen". Several young women lived with Mark, two of whom he later accused of defrauding him. Ronson interviewed Mark at his home as well as his then-business adviser Charles Cady, who told Ronson that Mark was under federal investigation. Ronson wrote about this in his 2026 book, The Castle (ISBN 9780241754771), in which both he and Mark compare Mark to Hugh Hefner.

== Sale listings ==
The castle has been put up for sale, first by Christie's International Real Estate in 2014 for $45m, dropping to $39m and then $32m before being removed from sale in 2016. It was put up again in November 2021 for $35m, rising to $60m in 2022, before again being removed from sale that August. The latter price was the highest for a residency in Connecticut. A year on in August 2023 and the property was again for sale, this time for $26m. The real estate agent said in 2021, "It's so unique and the buying pool is so narrow … overall it's not competing with anything else".

The listings were widely shared on social media and were popular on real estate websites.
