= Woodstock Academy =

The Woodstock Academy
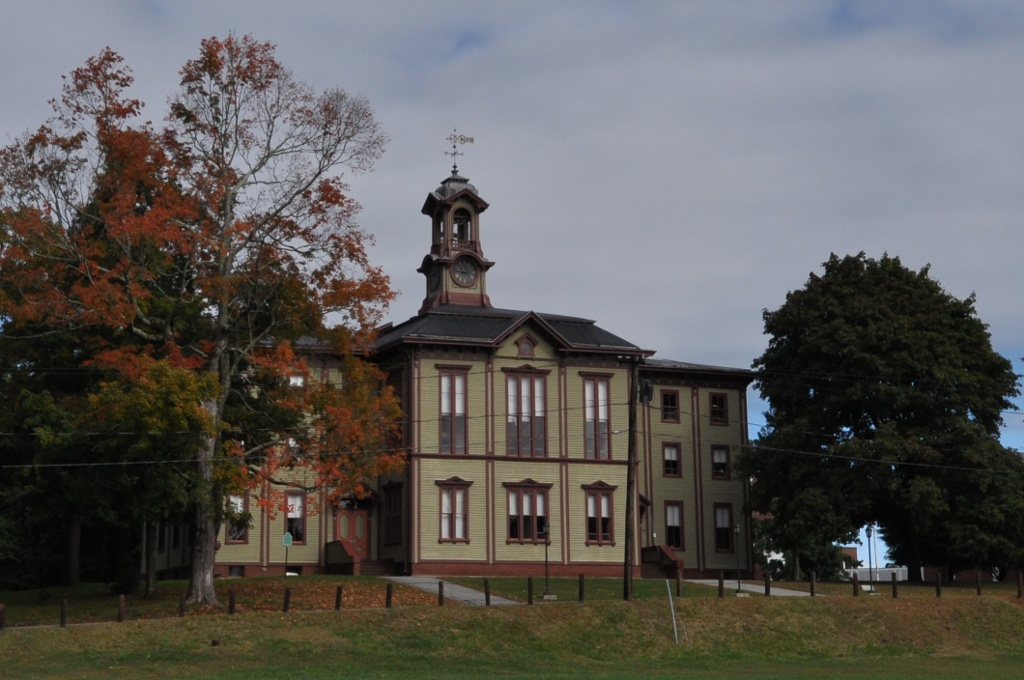
- Woodstock Academy Classroom Building

Location
- Woodstock, Connecticut 06281; United States; 41°57′03″N 71°58′32″W

Information
- Type: Public
- Motto: Look to your Future, Look to Woodstock Academy
- Established: 1801 (225 years ago)
- CEEB code: 070975
- Head of school: Dr. Lawrence Filippelli
- Staff: 54
- Faculty: 85
- Grades: 9-12 and postgraduate
- Enrollment: 1,098 (2018–19)
- Colors: Yale blue and gold
- Athletics: 38 team sports
- Athletics conference: Eastern Connecticut Conference
- Mascot: Centaur
- Sending towns (Note: "Sending towns" mean those that pay the school to take their high school-aged students, so the school functions as a public high school for those particular towns. The towns' school districts do not operate high schools themselves, but instead contract high school to Woodstock Academy.): Brooklyn, Canterbury, Eastford, Pomfret, Union, and Woodstock
- Website: www.woodstockacademy.org

Woodstock Academy (WA), founded in 1801, is a high school located in Woodstock, Connecticut, United States. The Academy, which describes itself as an independent school, serves residents from the Connecticut towns of Brooklyn, Canterbury, Eastford, Pomfret, Union, and Woodstock. The respective towns' taxpayers pay student tuition through municipal taxes, and therefore state agencies and the National Center for Education Statistics (NCES) categorize Woodstock as a public school. The school also accepts tuition-paying students from surrounding towns and states as day students, and students from around the country and the world as residential students.

== History ==
In 1801 the school was organized by James and John McClellan, sons of Revolutionary War General Samuel McClellan. The Connecticut Legislature officially chartered the school in 1802.

In 1969 the Woodstock School Committee designated Woodstock Academy as the secondary public school of the town.

In 1977 the Connecticut State Freedom of Information Commission ruled that Woodstock Academy must make its records public. In July 1980 the Connecticut Supreme Court ruled that Woodstock Academy is a public agency, because it serves three Connecticut towns in the manner that a public high school would, and therefore it must release all of its financial records under the Connecticut Freedom of Information Act.

In 1990 the school was planning to end Latin classes due to a lack of interest and the idea that students should study modern languages.

In 2012 the school was trying to recruit students from other regions of the United States and international students.

== Governance and service area ==
The school is not within any school district and is not controlled by any municipality; therefore it describes itself as an "independent school." The Connecticut State Department of Education does not list Woodstock in its list of non-public schools and therefore considers Woodstock to be a "public school" because the state of Connecticut oversees the school. In 2006 Shane, Navratil, and Co., a financial auditor, described the school as private. Woodstock Academy is also independently funded by student tuition and a growing endowment. Woodstock is a member of the Connecticut Association of Boards of Education and the Connecticut Association of Independent Schools. The New England Association of Schools & Colleges, Incorporated accredits The Woodstock Academy as an "independent school".

A 1997 Hartford Courant article described the school as "a quasi- private, independent school", and another called it a "private school". A 1990 Worcester Telegram & Gazette article described the school as "a privately endowed secondary school incorporated by the state to act as the town's public high". The National Center for Education Statistics (NCES) categorizes Woodstock as public.

The school serves the towns of Woodstock, Eastford, Pomfret, Canterbury, Union, and Brooklyn. As of 1980 it is the only secondary school that serves the town of Woodstock. In 1980 the Associated Press stated that the school serves the three towns in a manner that a public high school would. The school is funded by student tuition, whether the tuition is paid by sending towns or individual families. In 1980 the Associated Press said that The Academy is "incorporated like a private school but functions like a public school." A board of thirty individuals from the region operates the school. The Connecticut Supreme Court in 1980 supported a decision from a lower court that the school has an obligation to release records to the public due to its function as a public school.

== Facilities ==
Woodstock Academy has boarding facilities. The historic Woodstock Academy Classroom Building was constructed in 1873 and is listed on the National Register of Historic Places.

1. Woodstock Academy – North Campus, 57 Academy Road, Woodstock, CT 06281
2. Woodstock Academy – South Campus, 150 Route 169, Woodstock, CT 06281
3. Woodstock Academy – Bentley Athletic Complex, 423 Route 169, Woodstock, CT 06281

It was announced in October 2016 that Woodstock Academy would purchase the nearby 127-acre (51 ha) Hyde School campus for $15 million. The funds were loaned from the federal government, with the loan from the Rural Development Program of the United States Department of Agriculture. Acquisition of the site, originally the campus of Annhurst College, was completed in 2017.

The school established a bus system between the two campuses and lengthened periods between classes. The South Campus is 2.2 miles (3.5 km) from the North Campus. The purchase gave the school the three dormitories: it had plans to increase the number of dormitory students in a gradual manner based upon whether the numbers of zoned students decrease.

== Demographics ==
In 2017 its enrollment was 1,050, with 94 of them categorized as international students.

== Notable alumni and faculty ==
- Henry Chandler Bowen, businessman, philanthropist, and newspaper publisher in New York City; original owner of Roseland Cottage in Woodstock
- Augustus Sabin Chase (1828–1896), industrialist in Waterbury
- Ernest Haskell, artist and illustrator
- William L. Marcy, U.S. Senator, Governor of New York, U.S. Secretary of War, U.S. Secretary of State; negotiator of the Gadsden Purchase
- Tre Mitchell (born 2000), basketball player
- James W. Patterson, U.S. Representative and U.S. Senator from New Hampshire
- Ebenezer Stoddard, U.S. Representative from Connecticut
- Theodore Stowell, president of Bryant University
- Jacob Toppin (born 2000), basketball player in the Israeli Basketball Premier League, formerly in the NBA
- Alexander Warner, Union Army officer, banker, planter, and Republican politician
- Warren Wheaton, philanthropist, co-founder and namesake of Wheaton College and Wheaton, Illinois

== See also ==
Other Connecticut private academies acting as public high schools:

- Gilbert School
- Norwich Free Academy

Private academies in New Hampshire acting as public high schools:

- Coe-Brown Northwood Academy
- Pinkerton Academy

Private high schools in Maine which take students with public funds (from unorganized areas and/or with agreements with school districts):

- Foxcroft Academy
- Lee Academy
- Lincoln Academy
- George Stevens Academy
- Washington Academy
- Waynflete School
