= Lake Bungee, Connecticut =

Census-designated place in Connecticut, United States

- Census-designated place
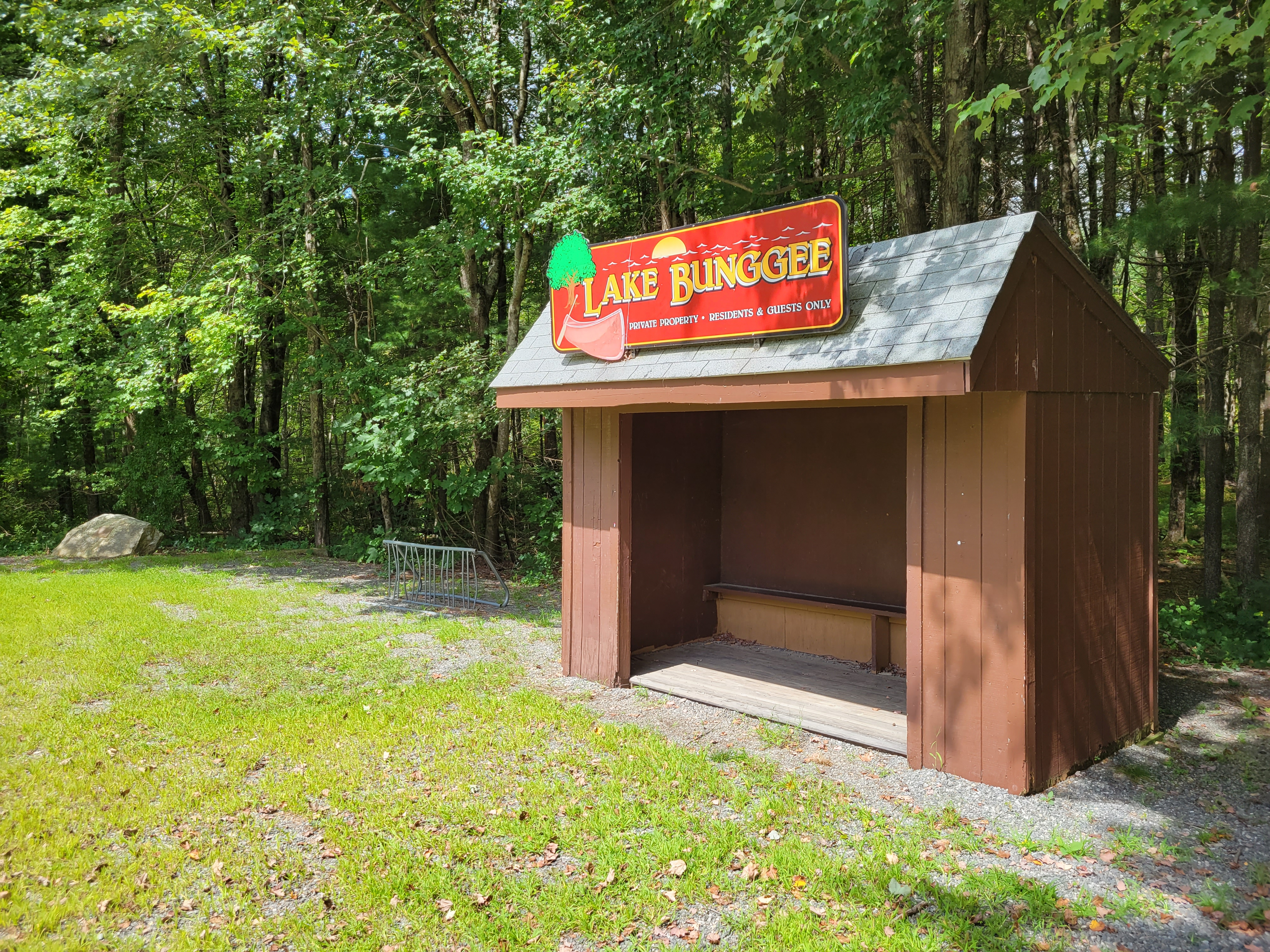
- Lake Bunggee Bus Stop

- Location within Connecticut Location within the United States
- Coordinates: 41°57′12″N 72°3′51″W
- Country: United States
- State: Connecticut
- County: Windham
- Town: Woodstock

Area
  - Total: 0.54 sq mi (1.40 km^{2})
  - Land: 0.37 sq mi (0.95 km^{2})
  - Water: 0.17 sq mi (0.45 km^{2})
- Elevation: 605 ft (184 m)
- Time zone: UTC-5 (Eastern (EST))
  - Summer (DST): UTC-4 (EDT)
- ZIP Code: 06282 (Woodstock Valley)
- Area codes: 860/959
- FIPS code: 09-41226
- GNIS feature ID: 2805989

Lake Bungee is a census-designated place (CDP) in the southwestern part of the town of Woodstock in Windham County, Connecticut, United States, surrounding a lake of the same name. It is bordered to the west by the Witches Woods CDP. As of the 2020 census, Lake Bungee had a population of 601.

Lake Bungee was first listed as a CDP prior to the 2020 census.
