= Quasset Lake, Connecticut =

Census-designated place in Connecticut, United States

- Census-designated place
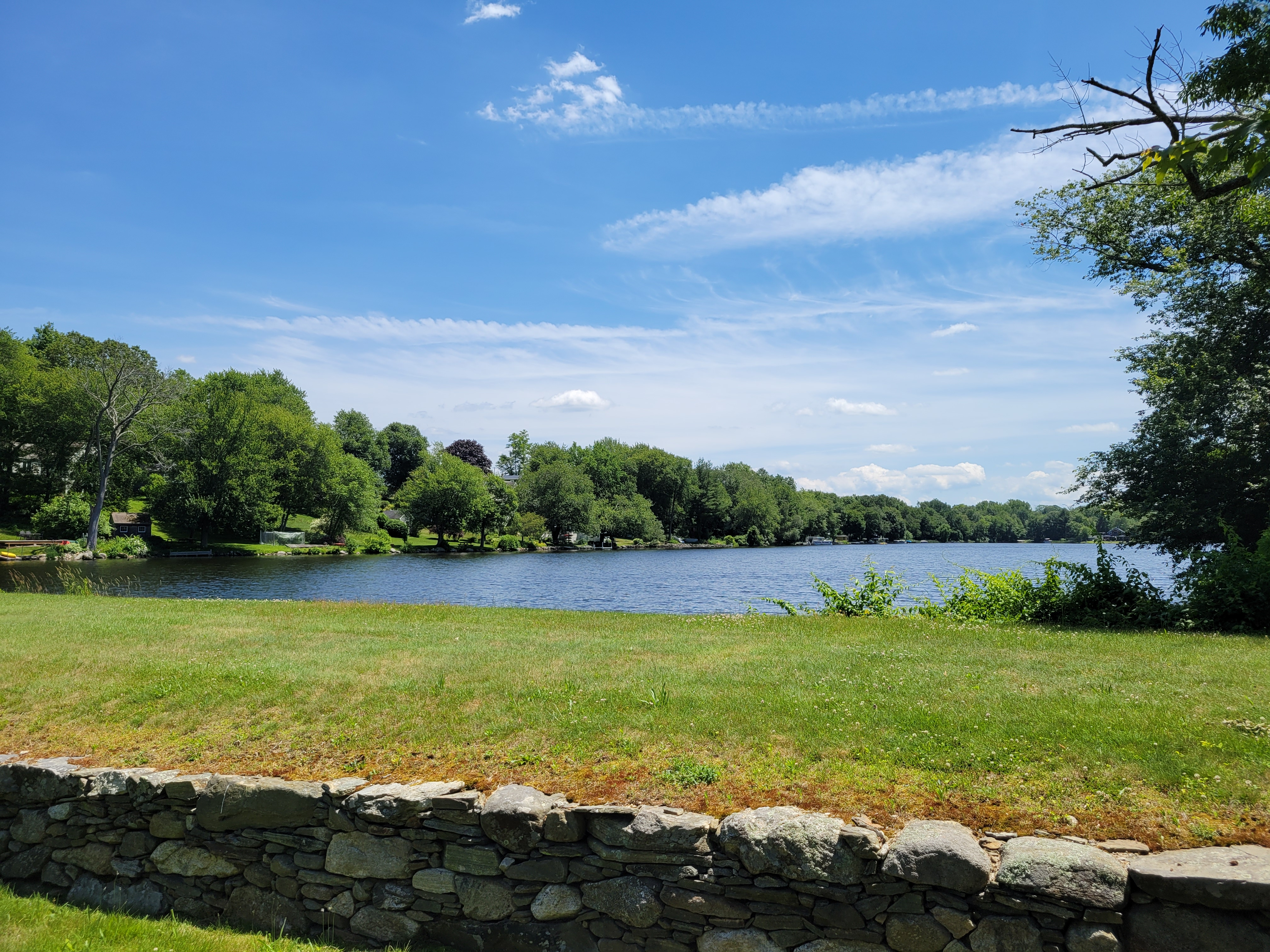
- Quasset Lake

- Location within Connecticut Location within the United States
- Coordinates: 41°55′21″N 71°59′2″W
- Country: United States
- State: Connecticut
- County: Windham
- Town: Woodstock

Area
  - Total: 0.46 sq mi (1.20 km^{2})
  - Land: 0.32 sq mi (0.84 km^{2})
  - Water: 0.14 sq mi (0.36 km^{2})
- Elevation: 572 ft (174 m)
- Time zone: UTC-5 (Eastern (EST))
  - Summer (DST): UTC-4 (EDT)
- ZIP Code: 06281 (Woodstock)
- Area codes: 860/959
- FIPS code: 09-63165
- GNIS feature ID: 2805994
- Website: quassetlakedistrict.org

Quasset Lake is a census-designated place (CDP) in the southeastern part of the town of Woodstock in Windham County, Connecticut, United States, surrounding a lake of the same name. (Federal topographic maps use the name "Wappaquasset Pond".) It is bordered to the east by South Woodstock. As of the 2020 census, Quasset Lake had a population of 187.

Quasset Lake was first listed as a CDP prior to the 2020 census.
