= Witches Woods, Connecticut =

Census-designated place in Connecticut, United States

- Census-designated place
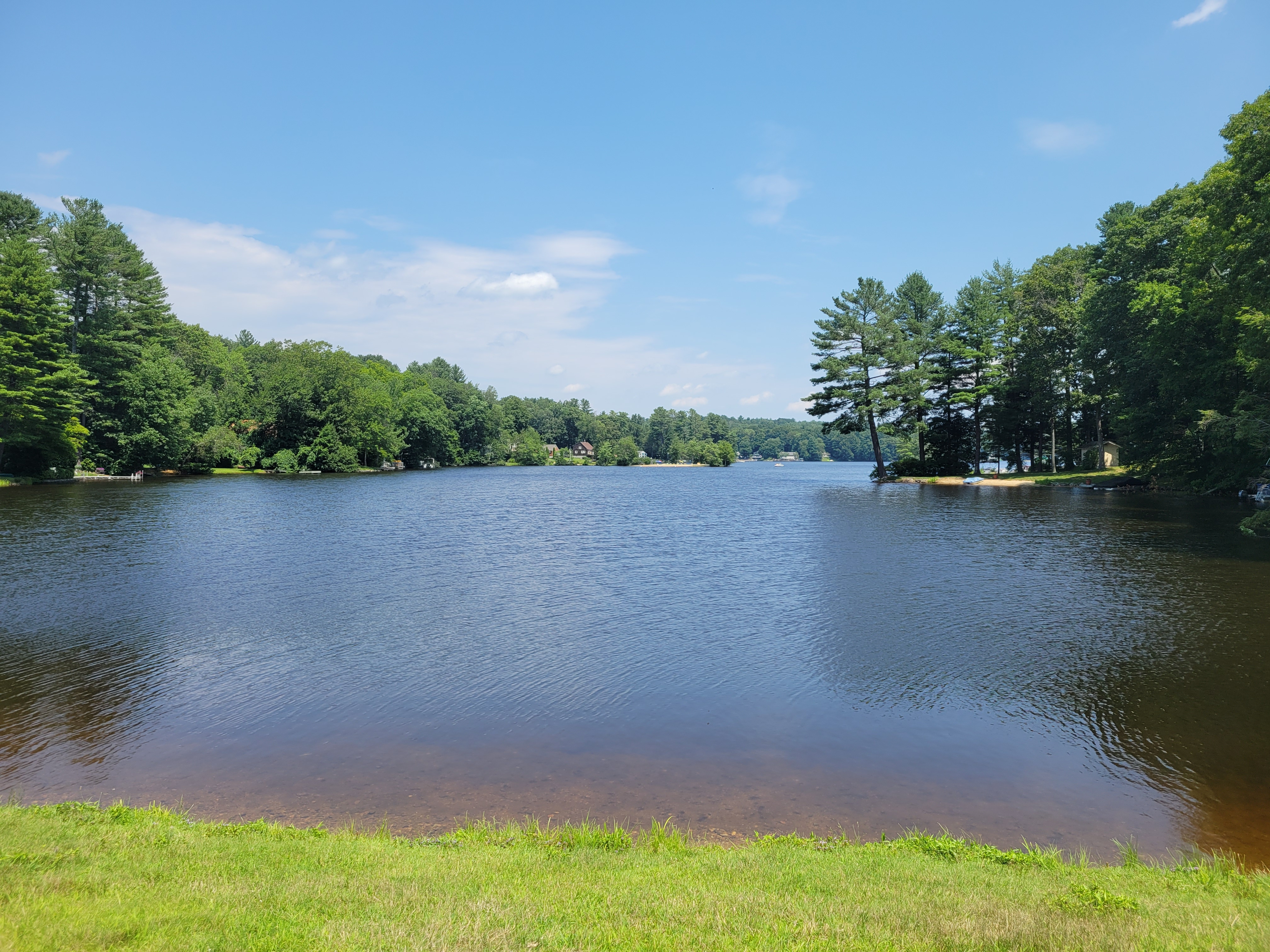
- Witches Woods Lake

- Location within Connecticut Location within the United States
- Coordinates: 41°56′54″N 72°4′20″W
- Country: United States
- State: Connecticut
- County: Windham
- Town: Woodstock

Area
  - Total: 0.20 sq mi (0.52 km^{2})
  - Land: 0.093 sq mi (0.24 km^{2})
  - Water: 0.11 sq mi (0.28 km^{2})
- Elevation: 597 ft (182 m)
- Time zone: UTC-5 (Eastern (EST))
  - Summer (DST): UTC-4 (EDT)
- ZIP Code: 06281 (Woodstock)
- Area codes: 860/959
- FIPS code: 09-87455
- GNIS feature ID: 2805996

Witches Woods is a census-designated place (CDP) in the southwest part of the town of Woodstock, Connecticut, United States, surrounding Witches Woods Lake. It is bordered to the northeast by the Lake Bungee CDP.

As of the 2020 census, Witches Woods had a population of 114.

Witches Woods was first listed as a CDP prior to the 2020 census.
