= Woodstock, Connecticut =

- Town
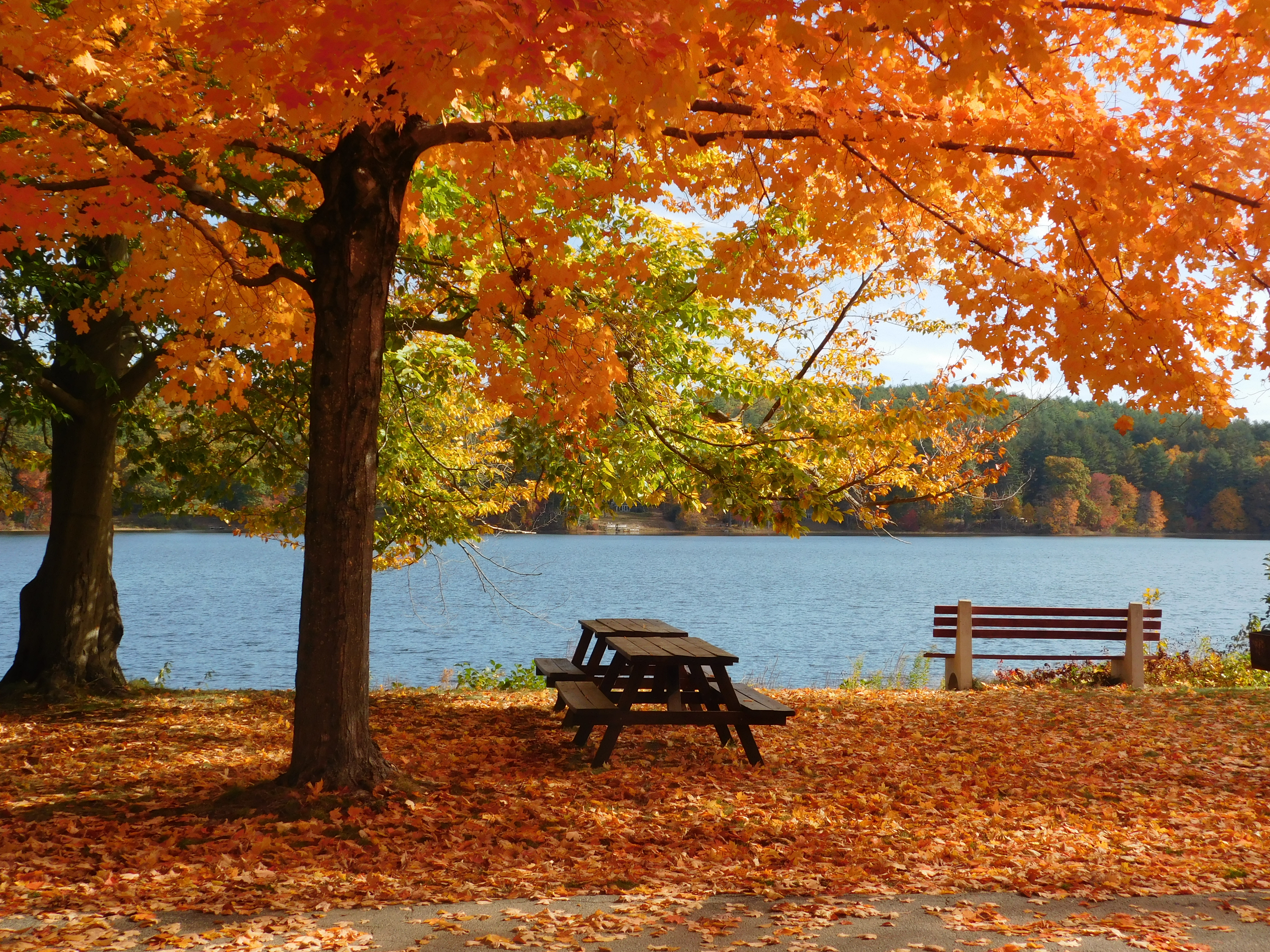
- View from Roseland Park in Woodstock

- Seal

- Coordinates: 41°58′N 72°1′W
- Country: United States
- U.S. state: Connecticut
- County: Windham
- Region: Northeastern CT
- Founded: 1686
- Annexed by Connecticut: 1749

Government
  - Type: Selectman-town meeting
  - First selectman: Chandler Paquette (R)
  - Selectman: Kate McDonald (D)
  - Selectman: Chris Mayhew (R)
  - State Senator: Jeff Gordon (R-35th District)
  - State Rep.: Pat Boyd (D-50th District)

Area
  - Total: 61.8 sq mi (160.1 km^{2})
  - Land: 60.5 sq mi (156.8 km^{2})
  - Water: 1.3 sq mi (3.4 km^{2})
- Elevation: 794 ft (242 m)

Population (2020)
  - Total: 8,221
  - Density: 136/sq mi (52.4/km^{2})
- Time zone: UTC-5 (Eastern)
  - Summer (DST): UTC-4 (Eastern)
- ZIP code: 06281, 06282
- Area codes: 860/959
- FIPS code: 09-88190
- GNIS feature ID: 0213541
- Website: www.woodstockct.gov

Woodstock is a town in Windham County, Connecticut, United States. The town is part of the Northeastern Connecticut Planning Region. The population was 8,221 at the 2020 census.

== History ==
=== 17th century ===
In the mid-17th century, John Eliot, a Puritan missionary to the Native Americans, established "praying towns", where Native Americans took up Christianity and were expected to renounce their religious ceremonies, traditional dress, and customs. One praying town, called Wabaquasset (Senexet, Wabiquisset), six miles west of the Quinebaug River in present-day Woodstock, was the largest of the three northeastern Connecticut praying towns.

In 1675, when King Philip's War broke out, some of the town's Indians, (especially in the southern part of the town) sided with the Mohegans and the English while others sided with the Indians led by Philip, rallying to arms on what is now Curtis Island in present Holland, Massachusetts and Brimfield, Massachusetts. During the war, the praying town became deserted, and the English with their Indian allies marched through Woodstock to present day Thompson in the summer of 1676 burning any crops or stored corn they could find.

In 1682, Massachusetts bought a tract of land, which included Woodstock, from the Mohegans. A group of 13 men from Roxbury, Massachusetts (home of the Pastorate of Woodstock's earlier visitor, John Eliot), settled the town in 1686 and named it New Roxbury. Judge Samuel Sewall suggested the town change its name to Woodstock in 1690, citing its proximity to Oxford, Massachusetts, and in 1749 the town became part of Connecticut. The present name is after Woodstock, in England.

=== 18th and 19th centuries ===
A farming town in the 18th century, Woodstock began attracting industry after the War of 1812. "By 1820, there were 2 distilleries, 2 wheel wrights, an oil mill, fulling mill, carding machines, grist mills, saw mills, a goldsmith, and twine and cotton batting operations. Woodstock Valley was known for its shoe factories," according to the history page at the Woodstock town government Web site.

By the middle of the 19th century, industry almost ceased, and Woodstock reverted to a rural state. The town then became a summer destination for wealthy city dwellers from around the East coast of the United States.

Henry C. Bowen was critical to this development. Bowen was a Woodstock native who became wealthy through the dry-goods business and publishing in Brooklyn, New York. He also founded the anti-slavery newspaper The Independent, helped found the Republican Party, and headed the lay managers of the famed Plymouth Church. Bowen had built a home in Woodstock and invested heavily in the improvement of his home town. Other lay leaders of Plymouth Church would summer with him, including Henry Ward Beecher, the church's pastor; Frederick Hinrichs, whose descendants still live in Woodstock; the Holt publishing family; the Tappans; and Albert Lythgoe, an Egyptologist renowned for pioneering the use of scientific methods in the unearthing of antiquities.

=== Fourth of July celebrations ===
Bowen hosted July 4 celebrations in Woodstock at his Roseland Park during the latter part of the 19th century. These festivities attracted as many as 10,000 people who heard speeches, saw fireworks, and drank pink lemonade. Bowen, often called "Mr. Fourth of July," eventually gave Roseland Park, which included a man-made lake, to the community.

Several U.S. Presidents visited Bowen's summer home on Woodstock Hill: Ulysses S. Grant, Benjamin Harrison, and Rutherford B. Hayes, as his guests and speakers for Fourth of July celebrations. Grant visited while he was a sitting president. Grant spent a night there in spite of the fact that Bowen (a teetotaler) forbade drinking and smoking in his home (Grant was made to smoke his cigars out on the porch, and he drank covertly). Hayes arrived for the July 4 celebration of 1883, and gave a speech in support of national education aid. Benjamin Harrison arrived in the first year of his presidency, planting a liberty tree during the 4th of July celebration. Other prominent visitors were Henry Ward Beecher and John C. Fremont.

=== Roseland Cottage ===
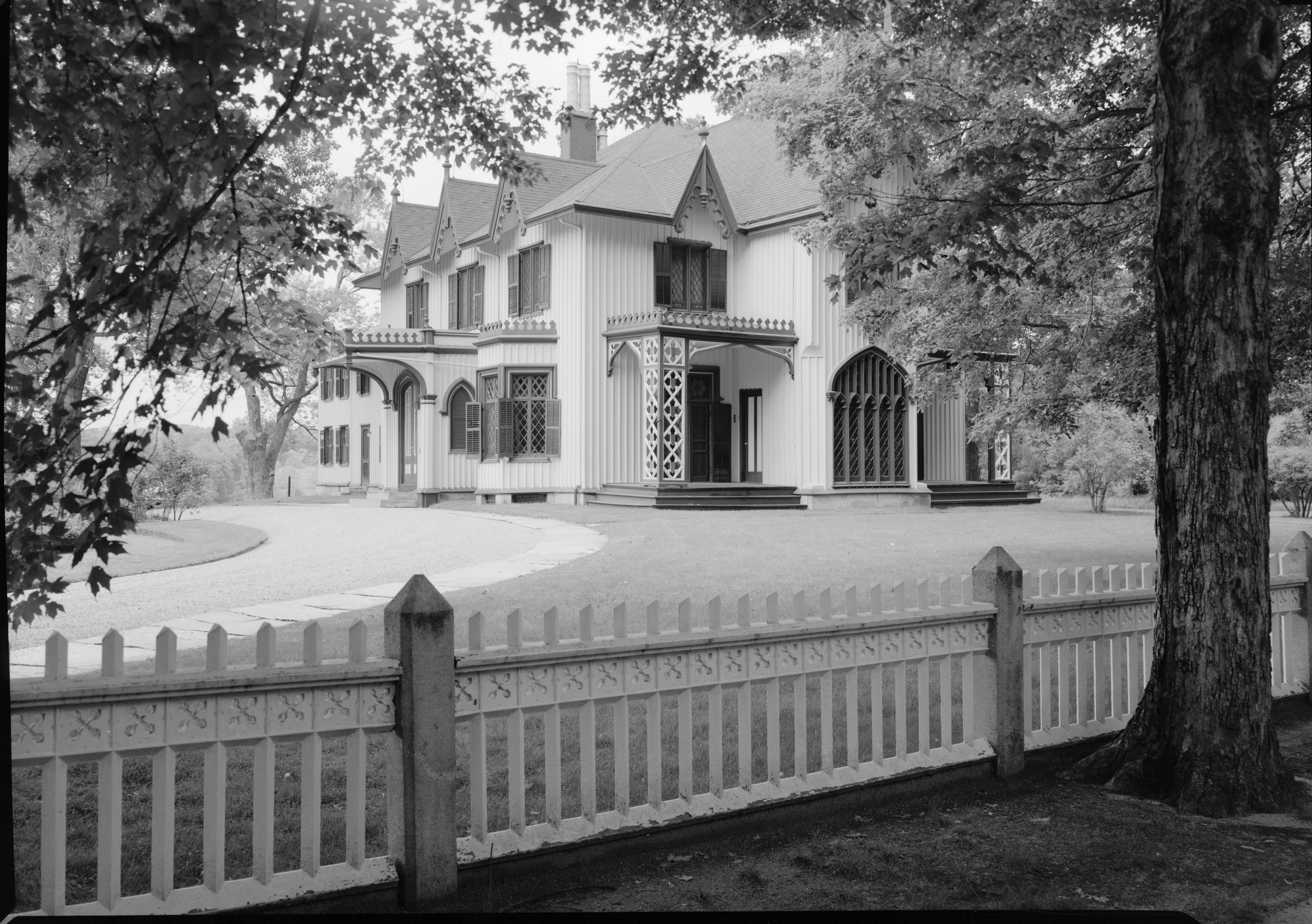
HABS photo of Roseland Cottage (1970).

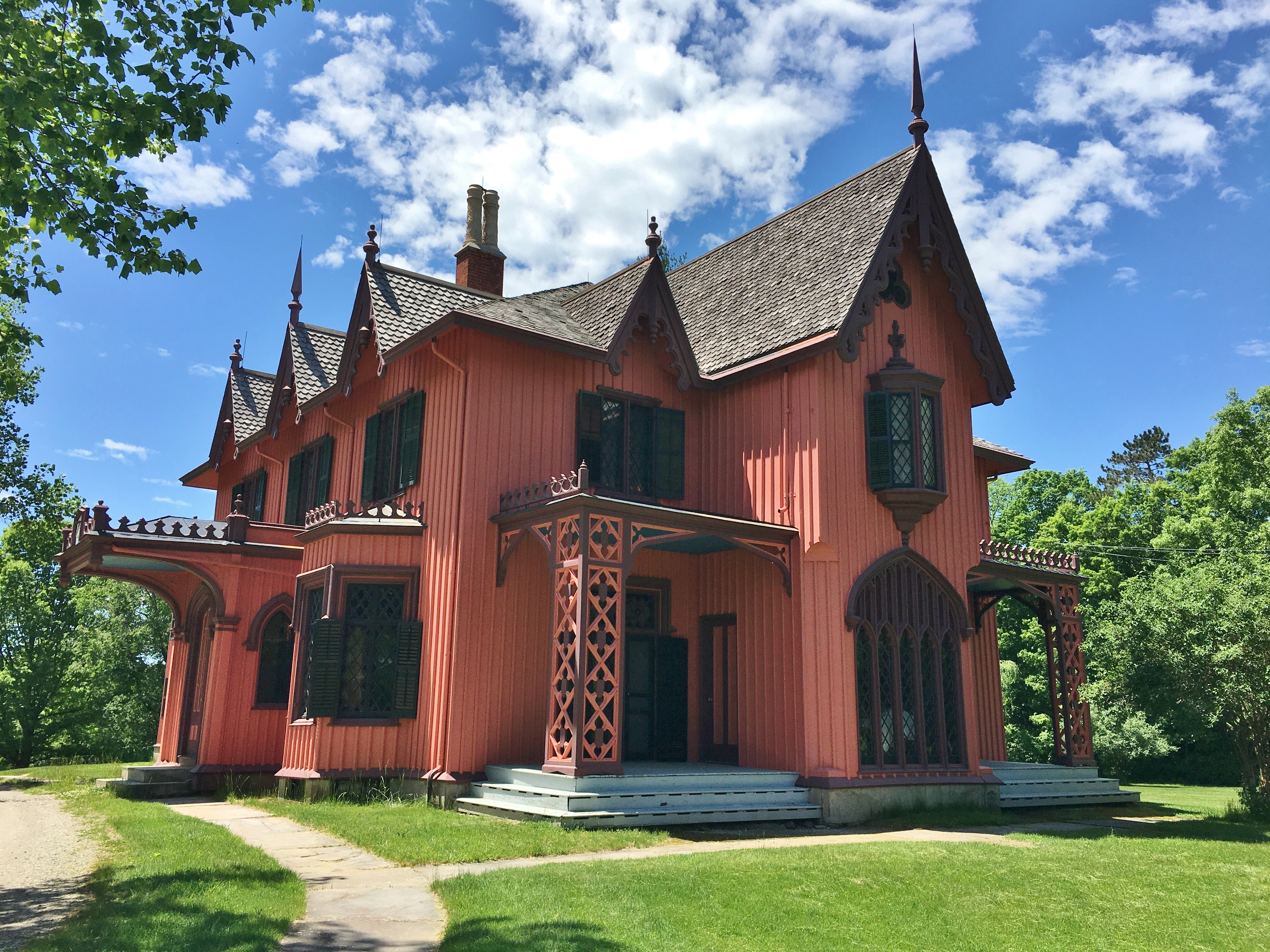
Photo of Roseland Cottage (2020).

Roseland Cottage, also known as the Pink House or the Bowen House, was a summer home built by wealthy businessman Henry C. Bowen in 1846. This is where Bowen hosted U.S. Presidents for his then-famous Independence Day celebrations at Roseland Park. Ulysses S. Grant bowled his first strike in the bowling alley located in the carriage barn.

The pink-colored house features "tall, angular gables, gingerbread trim, and 21 formal flower gardens outlined by dwarf boxwood hedges," according to a Hartford Courant article. Roseland is an example of Victorian Gothic Revival style, which can be seen in its pointed gables, scrolled bargeboards, many tall chimneys, and leaded glass windows in diamond shapes. The outside walls, of board and batten wood siding, have been painted 13 different colors over the past 150 years—all shades of pink. As of the summer of 2006, the house was a coral or salmon color. The house still includes the owners' original furniture and knickknacks.

Roseland was designed (under Bowen's direction) by architect Joseph C. Wells. The design was influenced by the design books of architectural critic Andrew Jackson Downing.

Fine Homebuilding magazine named Roseland one of the 25 most important houses in America in its 2006 Fine Homebuilding Houses Annual Issue.

Roseland Cottage was purchased by Historic New England in 1970 and is currently open to the public for tours.

=== Events ===
- The Woodstock Fair, run by the Woodstock Agricultural Society (established in 1846) has been held since 1860.

== Geography ==
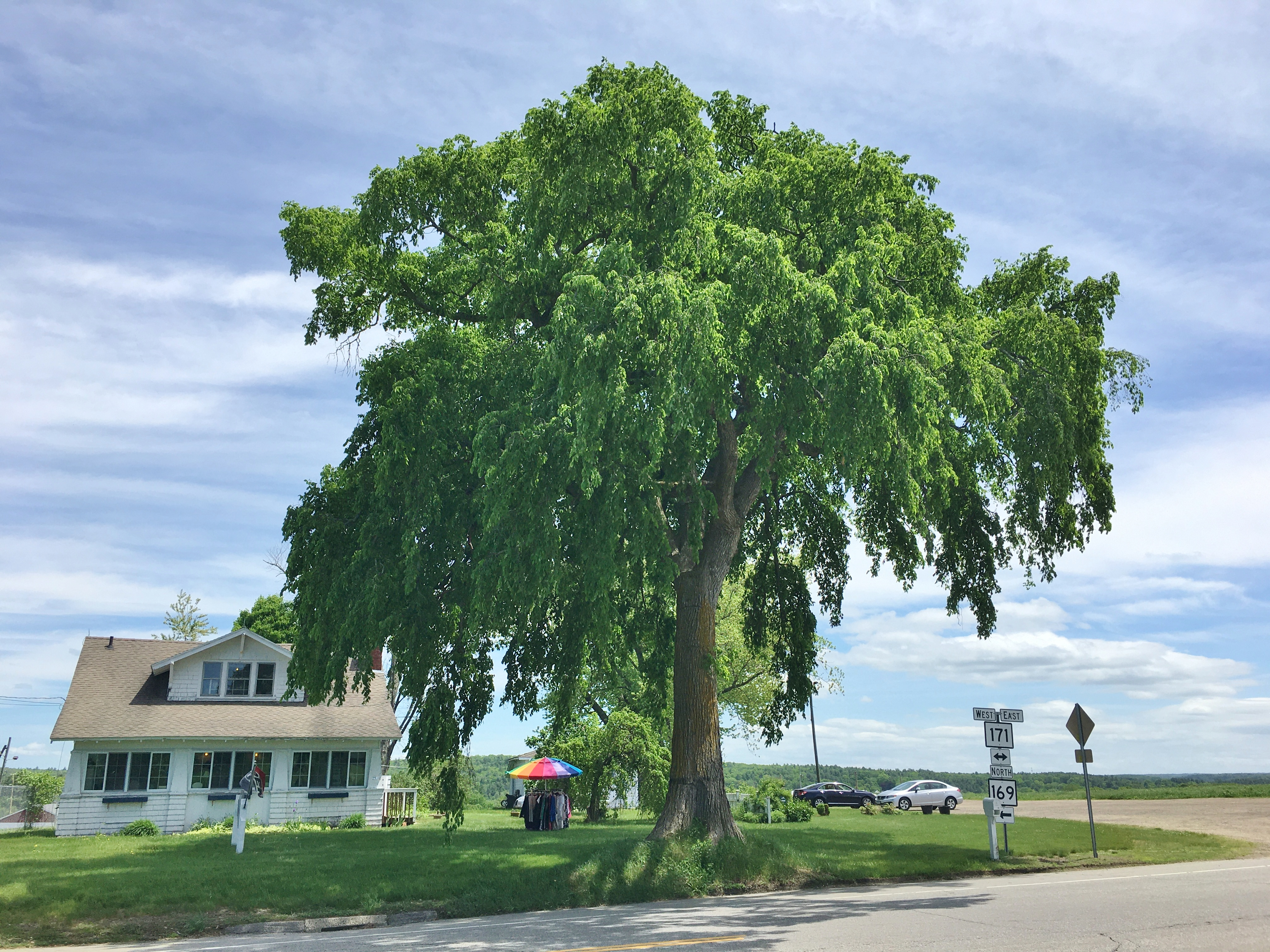
The largest known elm tree in Woodstock is located close to the Woodstock Fairgrounds (2020).

According to the United States Census Bureau, the town has a total area of 61.8 square miles (160 km^{2}), of which 60.5 square miles (157 km^{2}) is land and 1.3 square miles (3.4 km^{2} or 2.10%) is water. It is the second-largest town in Connecticut in terms of land area (after New Milford). The 42nd parallel north and the 72nd meridian west meet in the north central part of town.

=== Principal communities ===
- East Woodstock
- Harrisville
- Kenyonville
- Lake Bungee
- North Woodstock
- Quasset Lake
- South Woodstock
- West Woodstock
- Witches Woods
- Woodstock Hill (town center)
- Woodstock Valley

== Demographics ==
Historical population
Census	Pop.	Note	%±
1820	3,017		—
1840	3,053		—
1850	3,381		10.7%
1860	3,285		−2.8%
1870	2,955		−10.0%
1880	2,639		−10.7%
1890	2,309		−12.5%
1900	2,095		−9.3%
1910	1,849		−11.7%
1920	1,767		−4.4%
1930	1,712		−3.1%
1940	1,912		11.7%
1950	2,271		18.8%
1960	3,177		39.9%
1970	4,311		35.7%
1980	5,117		18.7%
1990	6,008		17.4%
2000	7,221		20.2%
2010	7,964		10.3%
2020	8,221		3.2%
U.S. Decennial Census

As of the census of 2000, there were 7,964 people, 3,151 households, and 2,330 families residing in the town. The population density was 131.6 inhabitants per square mile (50.8/km^{2}). There were 3,582 housing units at an average density of 59.2 per square mile (22.9/km^{2}). The racial makeup of the town was 97.2% White, 0.4% African American, 0.3% Native American, 0.7% Asian, 0.000001% Pacific Islander, 0.4% from other races, and 1.0% from two or more races. Hispanic or Latino of any race were 1.5% of the population.

Of the 3,151 households: 31.7% had children under the age of 18 living with them, 62.5% were married couples living together, 7.6% had a female householder with no husband present, and 26.1% were non-families. 20.5% of all households were made up of individuals, and 7.9% had someone living alone who was 65 years of age or older. The average household size was 2.53 and the average family size was 2.93.

In the town, the population was spread out, with 23.1% under the age of 18, 6.2% from 18 to 24, 22.1% from 25 to 44, 35.2% from 45 to 64, and 13.4% who were 65 years of age or older. The median age was 44.1 years. For every 100 females, there were 98.1 males. For every 100 females age 18 and over, there were 96.3 males.

The median income for a household in the town was $81,705, and the median income for a family was $102,008. Males had a median income of $61,500 versus $43,750 for females. The per capita income for the town was $37,611. About 1.0% of families and 4.7% of the population were below the poverty line, including 4.6% of those under age 18 and 9.5% of those age 65 or over.

== Education ==
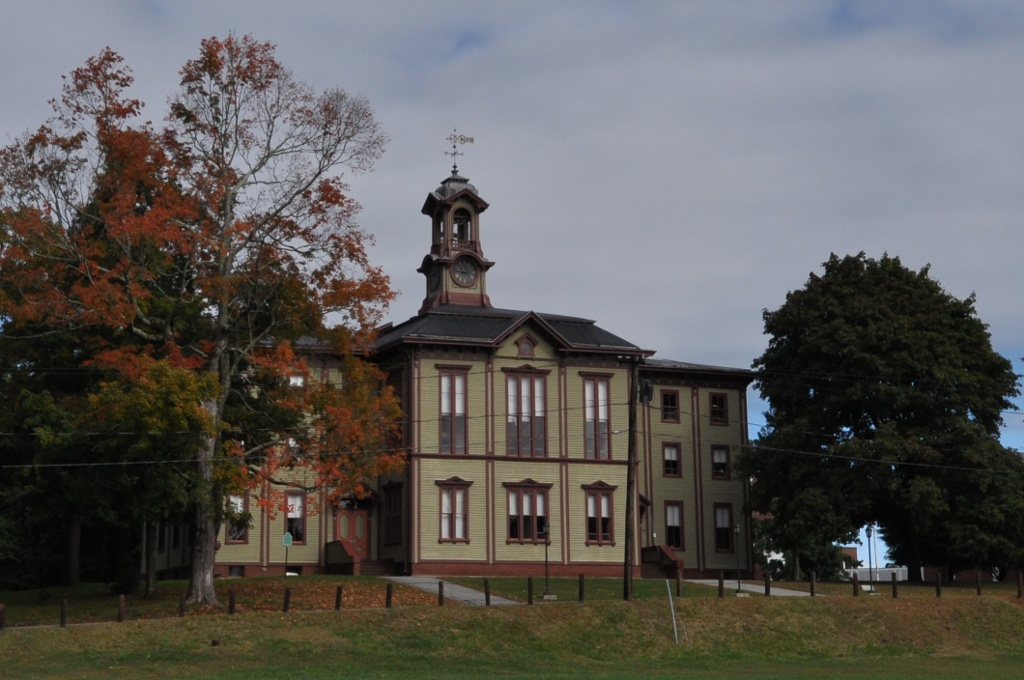
Woodstock Academy Classroom Building

Woodstock is served by the Woodstock School District. Woodstock Elementary School (Pre-Kindergarten through 4) and Woodstock Middle School (5–8) serve Woodstock. Dr. Francis Baran is the Superintendent. Woodstock Elementary School serves children in pre-Kindergarten through fourth grade. Enrollment exceeded 500 as of 2006. Woodstock Middle School, acquired in 1996, has an enrollment of more than 400 in Grades 5–8.

The town has an "Independent New England Academy" (a special public / private school governed by a 30-member Board of Trustees) called Woodstock Academy.

From 1941 to 1980, Woodstock was home to Annhurst College, a private, Catholic institution.

=== Woodstock Academy ===
Woodstock Academy, a "New England Academy" which is a corporate school (there are two others in the State; Norwich Free Academy and The Gilbert School) and is governed by a 30-member Board of Trustees, is located in Woodstock. Founded in 1801 as a New England Academy, Woodstock Academy briefly closed twice in the 19th century, and the second time was revived by local philanthropist and Academy graduate Henry C. Bowen. After Bowen's death, his family set up an endowment fund to help keep the school running. In 1915 it became designated the town of Woodstock's public high school. In 1932 Eastford, a nearby community, also designated it as its town high school. From 1915 until 2004 the Town of Woodstock had officially designated the academy as its public high school. Since then the town's Board of Education and the Academy Trustees have been unable to come to an agreement, although Woodstock continues to send its students to the academy for its high school.

Today the school serves the towns of Woodstock, Eastford, Pomfret, Union, Canterbury, and Brooklyn with a student population of over 1100. The school is often described as "independent" as it is not controlled by any of the municipalities that it serves or by a regional high school board.

Presently the Woodstock Board of Education is in the process of negotiating a new contract with the school, but negotiations have been at an impasse these last two years as the Woodstock Board of Education has been trying to get more financial control over Woodstock Academy, a school which, as of 2009, is administered by itself with oversight by the state of Connecticut.

== Points of interest ==
- Roseland Cottage
- Woodstock Academy
- Chris Mark Castle
- Camp Meet (Tyott Road)
- Solair Recreation League, a family nudist resort and campground

== Notable people ==
- William Eaton (1764-1811), United States Army officer and Consul General to Tunis
- Samuel McClellan (1730–1807), Brigadier General in the American Revolutionary War
- Samuel Chandler Paine (1807–1888), member of the Massachusetts State Legislature.
- Caroll Spinney (1933–2019), puppeteer known for playing Big Bird and Oscar the Grouch on Sesame Street
