= Roseland Cottage =

Historic house in Connecticut, United States

- Henry C. Bowen House
- U.S. National Register of Historic Places
- U.S. National Historic Landmark
- U.S. Historic district – Contributing property
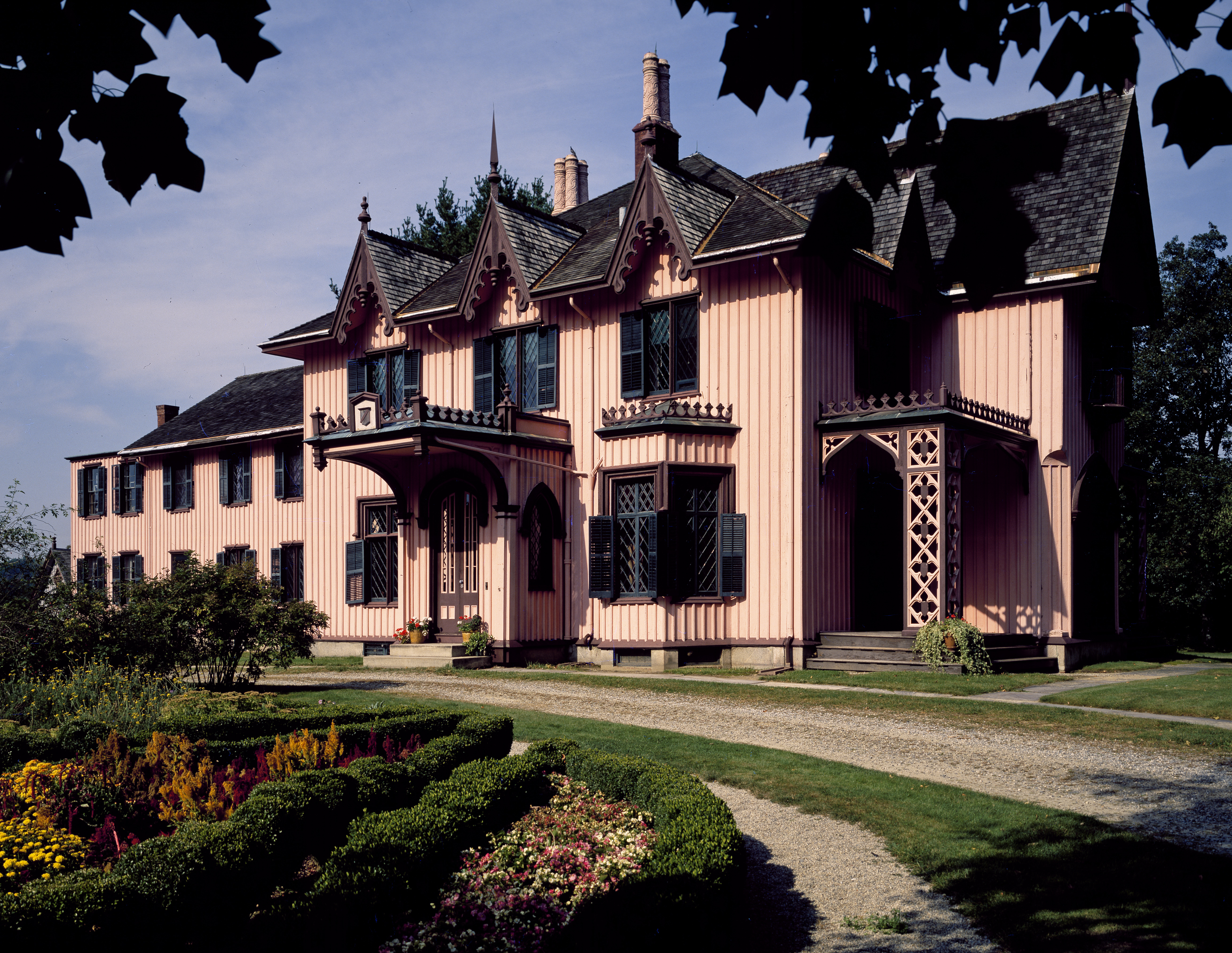
- Roseland Cottage

- Location within Connecticut Location within the United States
- Location: 556 Route 169, Woodstock, Connecticut
- Coordinates: 41°56′56.72″N 71°58′36.64″W
- Built: 1846
- Architect: Joseph Collins Wells; Edwin Eaton
- Architectural style: Gothic Revival
- Part of: Woodstock Hill Historic District (ID98001578)
- NRHP reference No.: 77001414

Significant dates
- Added to NRHP: August 24, 1977
- Designated NHL: October 5, 1992
- Designated CP: January 6, 1999

Roseland Cottage, also known as Henry C. Bowen House or as Bowen Cottage, is a historic house located on Route 169 in Woodstock, Connecticut, United States. The house was added to the National Register of Historic Places in 1977, and was declared a National Historic Landmark in 1992. It is described as one of the best-preserved and best-documented Gothic summer houses in the nation, with virtually intact interior decorations.

It is now owned by Historic New England, a non-profit organization that preserves the historical value of the house and operates it as a museum.

== History ==
Roseland Cottage was built in 1846 in the Gothic Revival style as the summer home of Henry Chandler Bowen and family. The entire complex, with a boxwood parterre garden, an icehouse, garden house, carriage barn, and the nation's oldest surviving indoor bowling alley, reflects the principles of writer and designer Andrew Jackson Downing. In his widely popular books, Downing stressed practicality along with the picturesque, and offered detailed instructions on room function, sanitation, and landscaping.

Beginning in 1870, the largest Fourth of July celebrations in the United States were held at Roseland Cottage. Four United States Presidents visited Bowen's summer home as his guests and speakers for these celebrations: Ulysses S. Grant, Benjamin Harrison, Rutherford B. Hayes, and William McKinley. Other prominent visitors included Henry Ward Beecher, Julia Ward Howe, Oliver Wendell Holmes Jr., and John C. Frémont. The home and gardens on one of these occasions were described in a local newspaper in 1887:

As one approached the house, the park in front of Roseland Cottage and the entire lawn appeared to be a mass of light with the Japanese lanterns of every conceivable shape hanging from the trees and every object that would support them, and colored lanterns supported upon sticks intermingled with them.

Today the house remains in excellent historic condition, with original Gothic furniture and embossed Lincrusta Walton wall decoration. The house, known locally as The Pink House, is currently painted coral pink, and located on Woodstock Hill Common. Roseland's parterre garden contain twenty-one flowerbeds with more than 4,000 annuals bordered in boxwood, in their original 1850 pattern, and now form part of Connecticut's Historic Gardens.

The house is a contributing property within NRHP-listed Woodstock Hill Historic District.

== Gallery ==
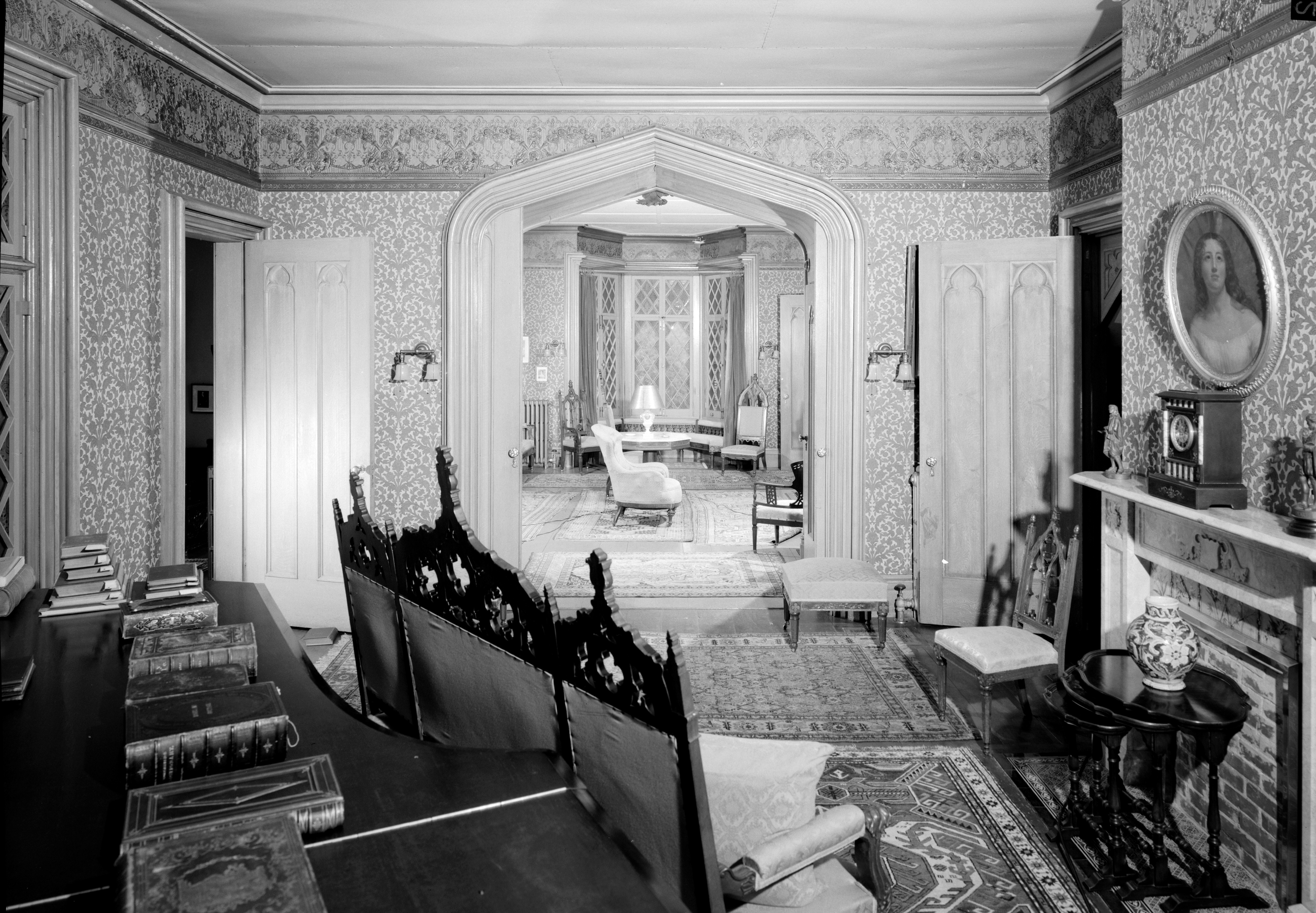
Interior view

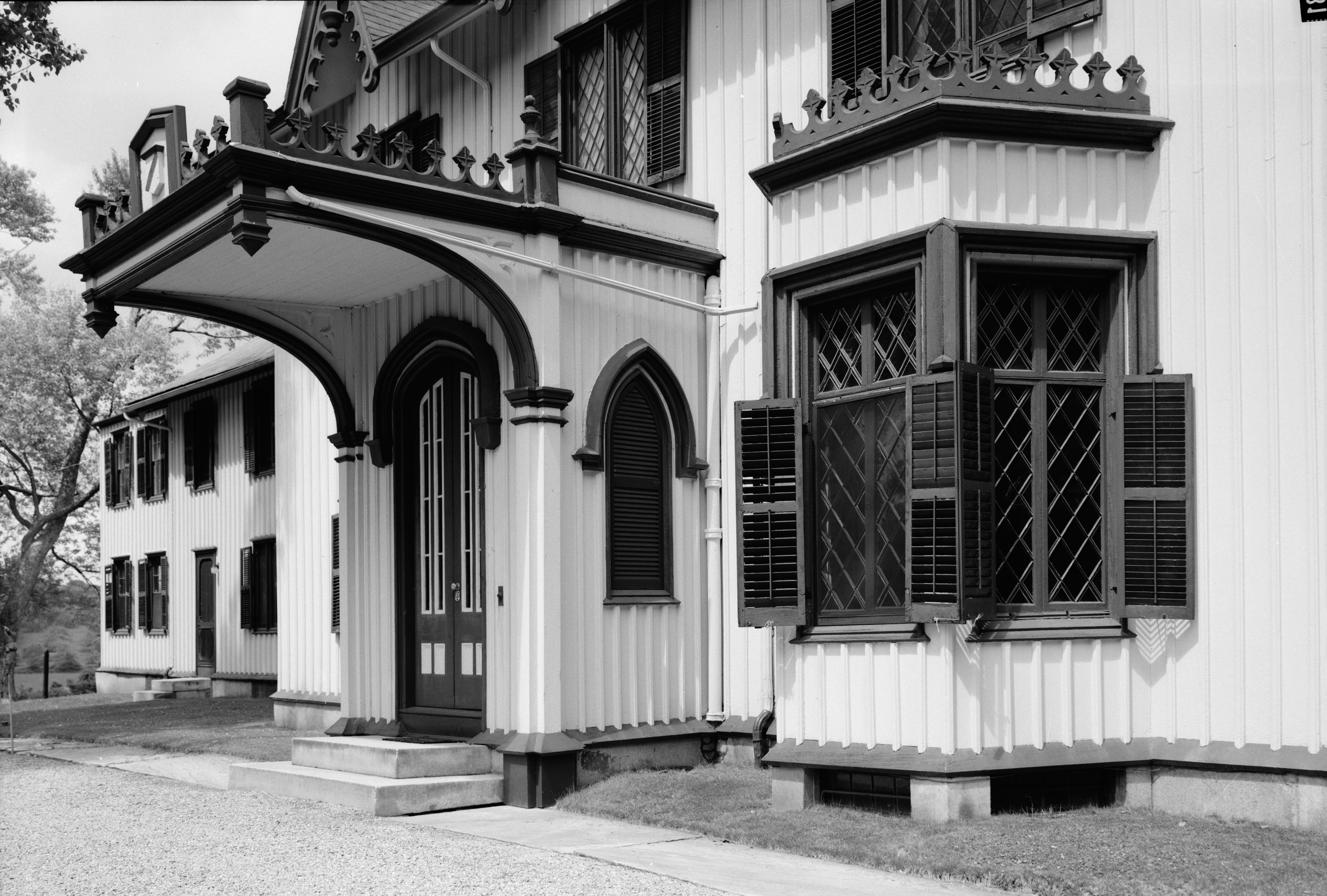
Entryway detail

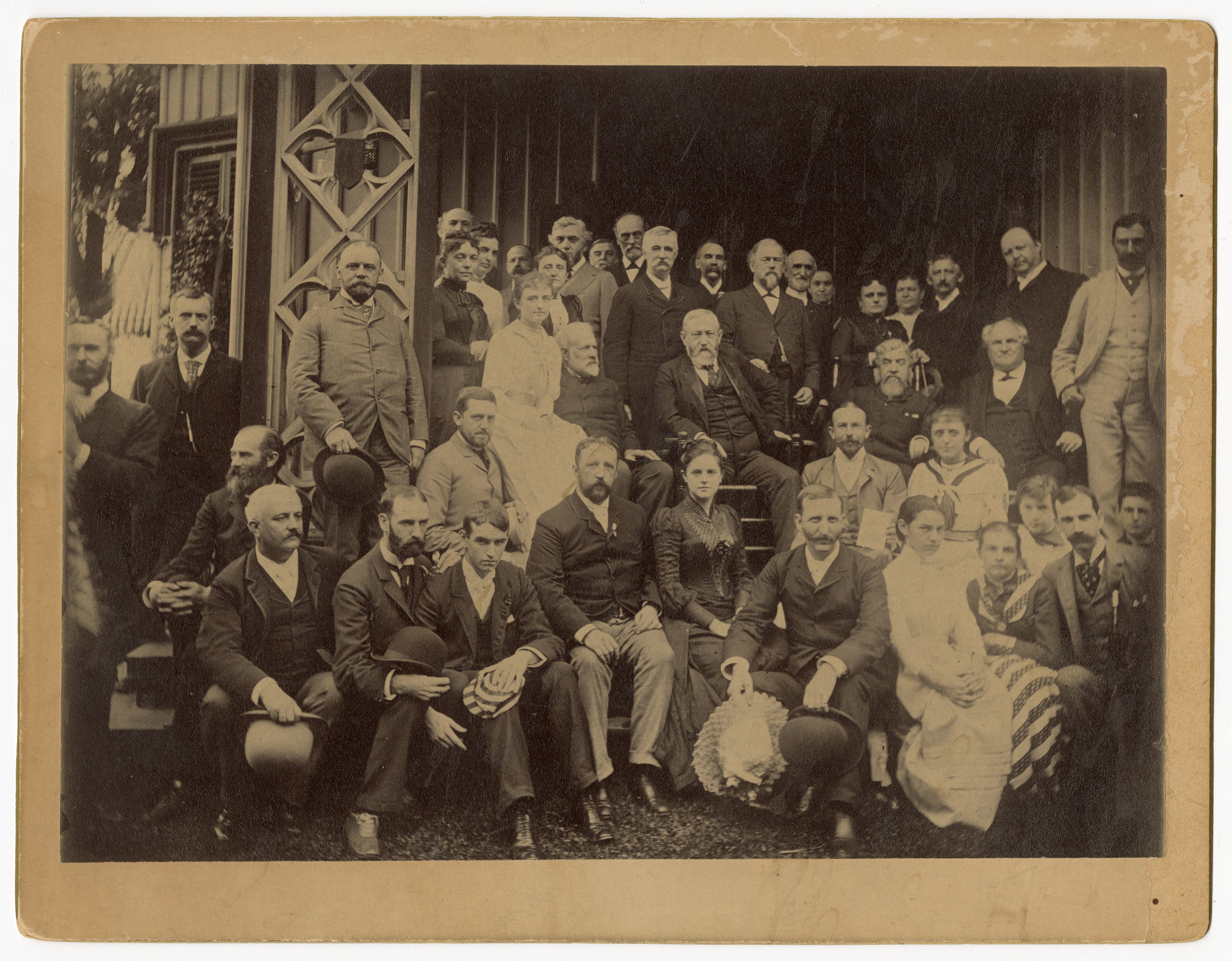
Benjamin Harrison and large group at Roseland Cottage

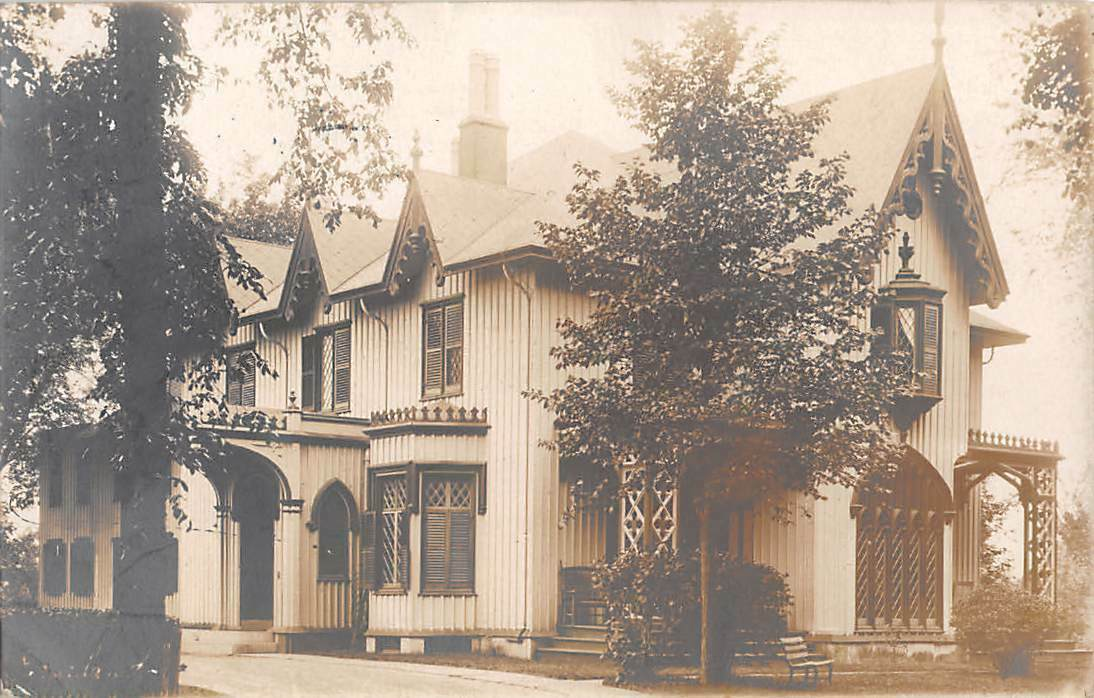
Roseland Cottage on a postcard sent in 1909

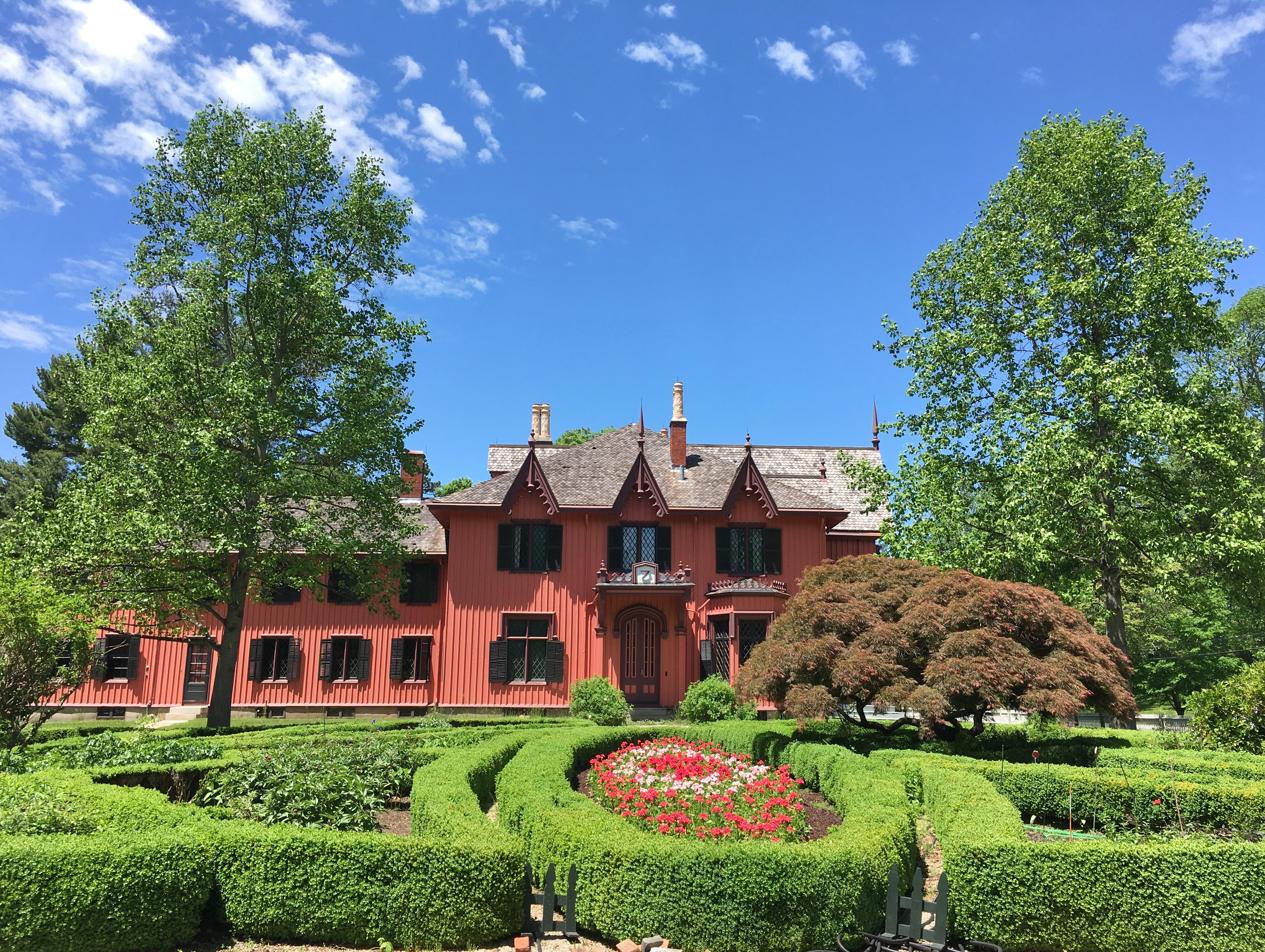
Cottage and garden (2020)

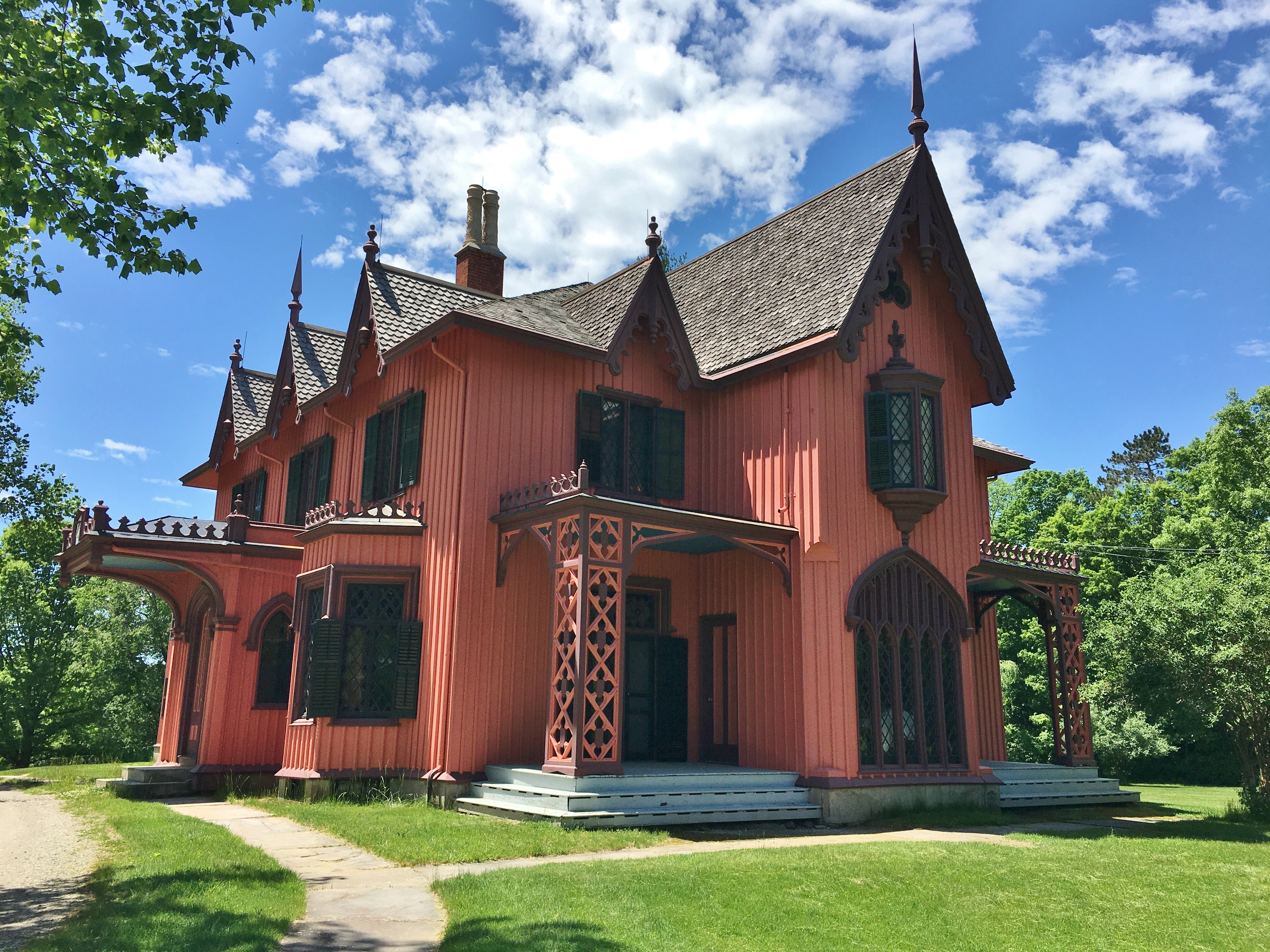
Exterior (2020)

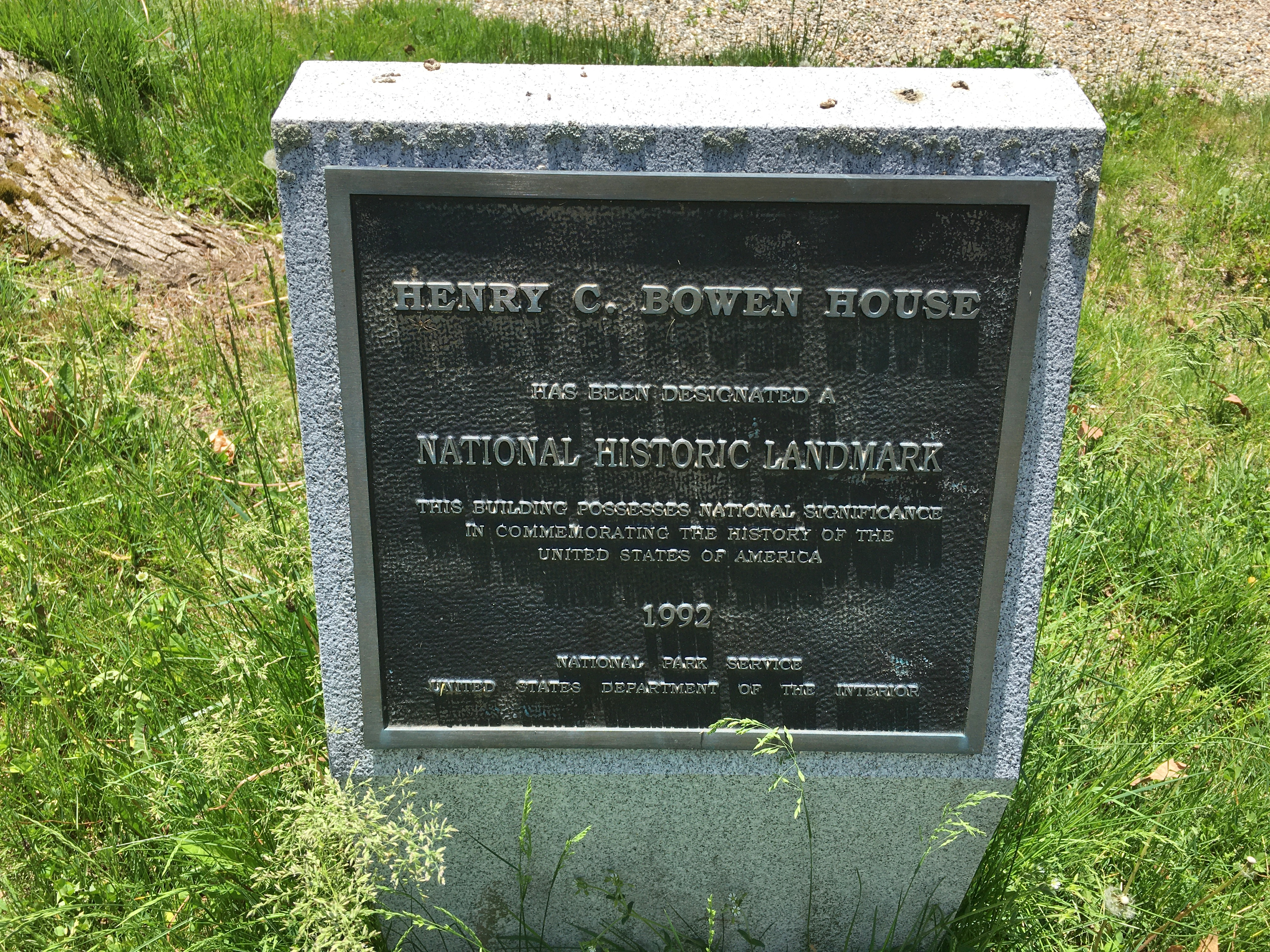
National Historic Landmark marker

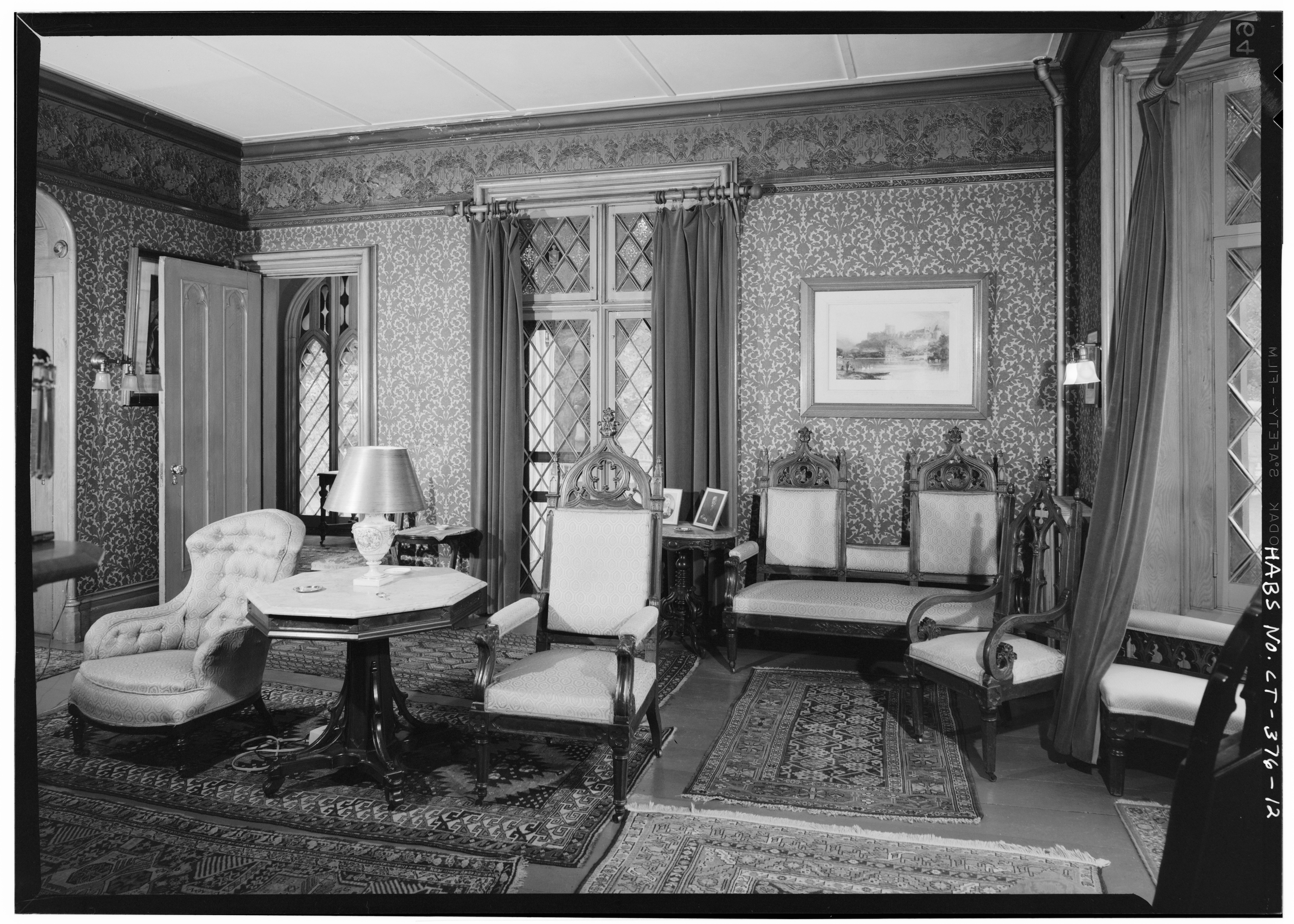
Interior, front parlor

== See also ==
- List of National Historic Landmarks in Connecticut
- National Register of Historic Places listings in Windham County, Connecticut
