= Henry Chandler Bowen =

American businessman (1813-1896)

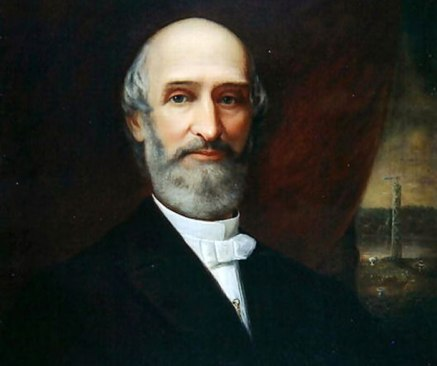
Henry Chandler Bowen, oil portrait, 41 1/2 x 36 3/8, 1876, Historic New England. Probably made by James J. Sawyer. Roseland Cottage is in the background of the portrait.

Henry Chandler Bowen (September 11, 1813 – February 24, 1896) was an American businessman, philanthropist, and publisher. He was an influential member of Plymouth Church in Brooklyn, where he resided much of his life and the founder of the New York-based newspaper The Independent. He built a Gothic-style summer home, Roseland Cottage, at his birthplace in Woodstock, Connecticut.

== Early life and education ==
Henry Chandler Bowen was born on September 11, 1813, in Woodstock his parents were George Bowen and Lydia Wolcott Bowen (née Eaton). He was educated at Woodstock Academy and Dudley Academy.

== Career ==
He moved to New York City and joined a dry-goods company owned by the abolitionist Arthur Tappan. Later he opened his own company Bowen and McNamee, specializing in silks. He opened a store on 112-114 Broadway, an Italian Marble building designed by English architect Joseph C. Wells. The company was renamed Bowen, Holmes and Company in 1859.

In 1848, Bowen founded The Independent, a weekly congregationalist newspaper that was closely associated with Plymouth Church in Brooklyn Heights, of which he was founding member. Plymouth's minister, Henry Ward Beecher, was the editor from 1861 to 1863 and a frequent contributor. The paper was strongly pro-abolitionist and pro-women's suffrage. Bowen served as the newspaper's chief financier and publisher and from 1870 until his death he was the editor as well. The paper has a circulation of 70,000 in 1870.

Abraham Lincoln was a subscriber of The Independent. Bowen was a key figure in inviting Lincoln to speak in New York at the Cooper Institute in February 1860, during which time he accepted Bowen's invitation to attend Plymouth Church to hear Beecher's sermon.

During the Civil War, Bowen lost most of his clients for his silk business (many from the South) and the company Bowen, Holmes and Company went bankrupt. By this time, he also had considerable income from the fire insurance business as well as his newspaper The Independent. In 1853, he established the Continental Insurance Company.

== Personal life ==
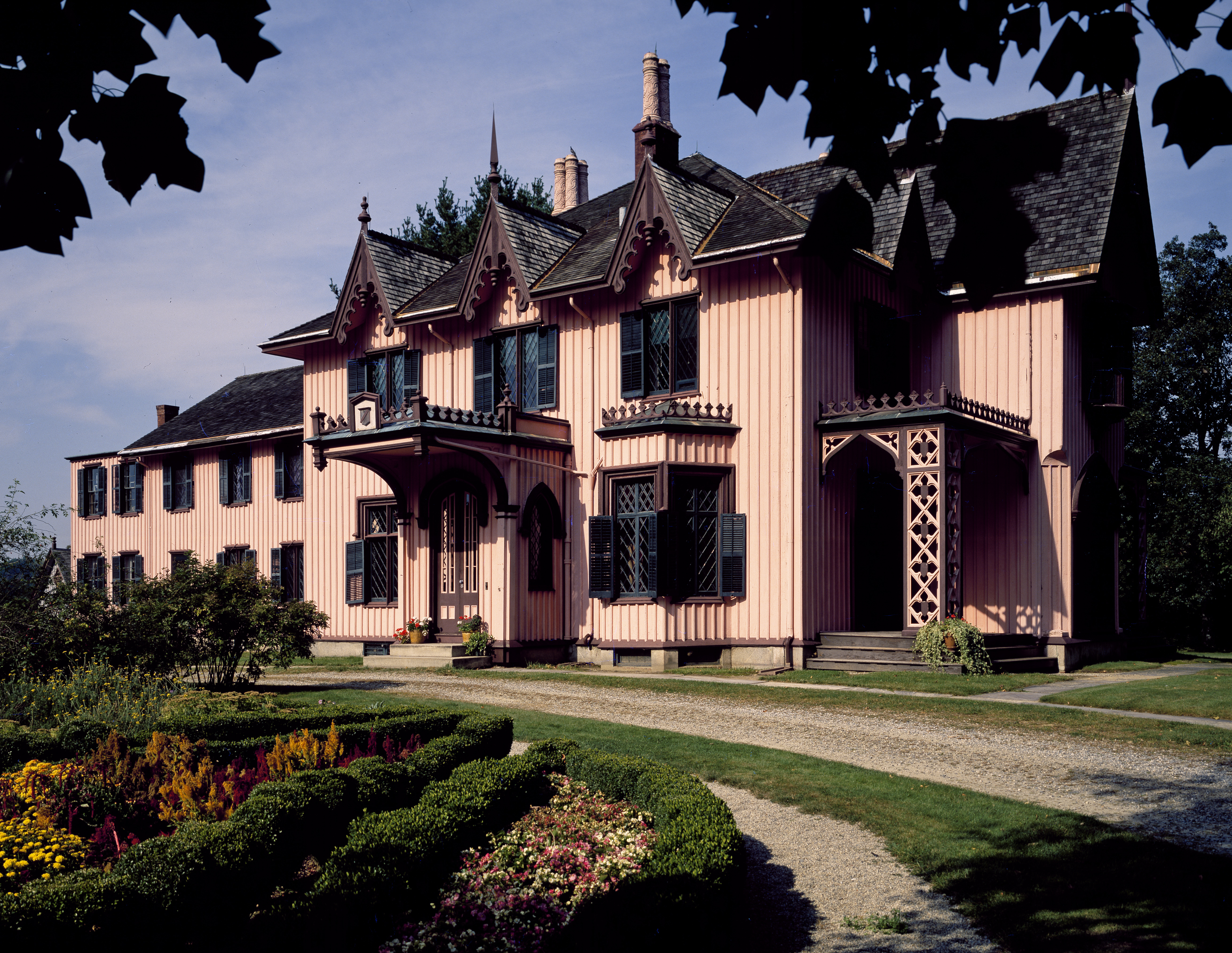
Roseland Cottage was built in 1846 in the Gothic Revival style as the summer home of Henry Chandler Bowen and family. The complex includes a boxwood parterre garden, an icehouse, garden house, and a carriage barn with a private bowling alley.

He married Lucy Maria, daughter of Lewis Tappan, on June 6, 1844, and they had 10 children. In 1862, as Lucy Maria, aged 38, lay on her deathbed, she confessed to Bowen that she had had a sexual relationship with Henry Ward Beecher. Bowen did not sue Beecher for adultery; the famous adultery case against Beecher was brought by Theodore Tilton. Bowen, however, was involved in arbitration with Beecher and Tilton, which related to Beecher's adultery and which was settled in 1872.

On December 25, 1865, Bowen married Ellen Holt.

In 1846, he hired architect Joseph Wells to build a summer home in Gothic Revival style called Roseland Cottage in Woodstock. The house is preserved today and is known as National Historic Landmark.

He was a founding member of the Congregationalist Church of the Pilgrims. (Note: Church of the Pilgrims was founded in 1844 and its building at Remsen and Henry Streets in Brooklyn Heights was designed by Richard Upjohn.) Two years later, he was a founding member of Plymouth Church in Brooklyn Heights, which was designed by Joseph C. Wells. In 1876, at a special meeting of the Plymouth Church Examining Committee, Bowen declared that Beecher was "an adulterer, a perjurer and a blasphemer". As a result, Bowen was expelled from the church.

Bowen and his family moved into a house at 90 Willow Street in the late 1840s or early 1850s.

Starting in 1870, Bowen hosted large Fourth of July celebrations at Roseland Cottage. Four United States presidents visited Bowen's summer home as his guests and speakers for these celebrations: Ulysses S. Grant, Benjamin Harrison, Rutherford B. Hayes, and William McKinley. Other prominent visitors included Henry Ward Beecher, Julia Ward Howe, Oliver Wendell Holmes Jr., and John C. Frémont.

Bowen made large philanthropic gifts to his hometown of Woodstock, CT. He made an endowment to his school Woodstock Academy. He presented Roseland Park to the town in 1876.
