= List of Beta Sigma Omicron chapters =

Beta Sigma Omicron was an American college sorority. It was founded in 1888 at the University of Missouri in Columbia, Missouri. The sorority established 61 chapters before merging with Zeta Tau Alpha in 1964. Following is a list of those chapters, with inactive chapters and institutions indicated in italics.

Chapter	Charter date and range	Institution	Location	Status	Ref.
Alpha	December 12, 1888 – 1892	University of Missouri	Columbia, Missouri	Inactive	
Beta	1891–1928	Synodical Female College	Fulton, Missouri	Inactive	(Note: The college closed in 1928.)
Gamma (1)	1892–1895	Missouri Valley College	Marshall, Missouri	Inactive	
Delta (1)	1898–1907	Sedalia High School	Sedalia, Missouri	Inactive	(Note: The chapter went dormant when the high school closed; its successor and the sole high school in Sedalia is Smith-Cotton High School, established in 1925.)
Epsilon	1902–1925	Hardin College	Mexico, Missouri	Inactive	(Note: The college closed in 1931)
Zeta (1)	1902–1909	Pleasant J. Potter College	Bowling Green, Kentucky	Inactive	(Note: This chapter originated as Mu Phi Psi (local), established before 1902. The chapter went dormant when its college closed in 1909, selling its property without merger to Western Kentucky Normal School.)
Eta	1902–1925	Stephens College	Columbia, Missouri	Withdrew (local)	(Note: Chapter withdrew to become Beta Sigma Beta (local))
Theta	1903–1914	Belmont College	Nashville, Tennessee	Inactive	(Note: The college closed in 1951, selling its property without merger to the Tennessee Baptist Convention, using the grounds and buildings to establish Belmont University)
Iota	1903–1907	Mary Baldwin Seminary	Staunton, Virginia	Inactive	
Kappa	1904–1913	Fairmont Seminary	Washington, D.C.	Inactive	(Note: The school name was variously reported as "Fairmount" or "Fairmont", the latter being the usage reflected here. Project editors assume this was due to a 100-year-old typo; same city, same founder. The same school briefly hosted chapters from ΑΣΑ, ΒΣΟ, and ΚΔ.)
Lambda	1906–1926	Hamilton College	Lexington, Kentucky	Inactive	(Note: The college closed in 1932)
Mu	1906–1912	Crescent College	Eureka Springs, Arkansas	Inactive	(Note: The college closed briefly in 1924, reopened as a junior college in 1930, and closed again in 1934.)
Nu	1907–1913	Brenau College	Gainesville, Georgia	Withdrew (ΔΔΔ)	(Note: This chapter originated as Sigma Theta Pi (local) before 1907. It withdrew to form Phi Beta (local) in consolidation with the Gamma chapter of Phi Mu Gamma. In 1915, Phi Beta (local) joined the Alpha Epsilon chapter of Delta Delta Delta.)
Xi	1908–1925	Central Female College	Lexington, Missouri	Inactive	(Note: The chapter went dormant when the college closed.)
Omicron	1908–1913	Liberty Ladies' College	Liberty, Missouri	Inactive	(Note: This chapter originated as Sigma Tau Phi (local) before 1908. The chapter went dormant when a fire on February 13, 1913 destroyed the college. Although the college soon merged with nearby William Jewell College, the chapter did not survive the process.)
Zeta (2)	1909–1921	Centenary College	Cleveland, Tennessee	Inactive	(Note: his school closed in 1929. Its grounds have been the site of several later schools, including Bob Jones College and, later, Lee University.)
Gamma (2)	1910–1915	Christian College	Columbia, Missouri	Inactive	(Note: This chapter originated as Lambda Mu (local) in 1899.)
Delta (2)	1911–1913	Women's College (Alabama)	Montevallo, Alabama	Inactive	
Pi	1913–1917	Hollins University	Hollins, Virginia	Withdrew (ΧΩ)	(Note: This chapter had its origin in Kappa Kappa Kappa (local) in 1905. It withdrew to become Beta Kappa (local). In 1919, it became the Upsilon Beta chapter of Chi Omega.)
Rho	1914–1920	Colorado Women's College	Denver, Colorado	Inactive	(Note: This chapter had its origin as Delta Pi (local) before 1914.)
Sigma	1915–1930	Greenville Women's College	Greenville, South Carolina	Inactive	(Note: This chapter originated as Pi Sigma Phi (local) in 1913.)
Tau	1916–1920	Lindenwood University	St. Charles, Missouri	Inactive	(Note: Lindenwood's four original sororities abruptly ceased in 1920 and 1921, with the campus welcoming replacements seventy years later.)
Upsilon	1916–1930	Belhaven University	Jackson, Mississippi	Inactive	(Note: The chapter originated as Mu Delta (local) in 1903.)
Phi	1918–1920	Grenada College	Grenada, Mississippi	Inactive	(Note: Grenada College closed in 1936.)
Chi				Unassigned	
Psi				Unassigned	
Omega				Unassigned	
Alpha Alpha	1923–1933	University of Wisconsin–Madison	Madison, Wisconsin	Inactive	(Note: The chapter originated as Sigma Omega Sigma (local) in 1923.)
Alpha Beta	1926–1937	Indiana University Bloomington	Bloomington, Indiana	Inactive	(Note: The chapter originated as Sigma Delta (local) in 1924.)
Alpha Gamma	1926–1932	University of Kentucky	Lexington, Kentucky	Inactive	(Note: The chapter originated as Omega Rho (local) in 1923.)
Alpha Delta	1926–1936	Illinois Wesleyan University	Bloomington, Illinois	Inactive	(Note: The chapter originated as Alpha Iota Sigma (local) in 1922.)
Alpha Epsilon	March 27, 1925 – 1933	University of California, Los Angeles	Los Angeles, California	Inactive	(Note: The chapter originated as Sigma Phi Delta (local) in 1923. In 1930, it absorbed the Delta chapter of Pi Sigma Gamma, a small national sorority that ceased operations fully in 1932. That chapter (ΠΣΓ) originated as Phi Delta Gamma (local) in 1925.)
Alpha Zeta	1926–1964	Millsaps College	Jackson, Mississippi	Merged (ΖΤΑ)	(Note: The chapter originated as Chi Kappa (local) in 1925. It became the Delta Phi chapter of Zeta Tau Alpha.)
Alpha Eta	1926–1933	University of New Mexico	Albuquerque, New Mexico	Inactive	(Note: The chapter originated as Delta Psi (local) in 1923.)
Alpha Theta	1927–1946	University of Southern California	Los Angeles, California	Inactive	(Note: The chapter originated as Theta Omicron (local) in 1924.)
Alpha Iota	April 12, 1927 – 1942	University of California, Berkeley	Berkeley, California	Inactive	(Note: The chapter originated as Delta Chi Delta (local) in 1922. In 1932, it absorbed the Alpha chapter of Pi Sigma Gamma, a small national organization it had founded in 1919, which ceased operations that year.)
Alpha Kappa	1927–1932	University of Mississippi	Oxford, Mississippi	Inactive	
Alpha Lambda	1927–1939	Northwestern University	Evanston, Illinois	Inactive	(Note: The chapter originated as Delta Mu (local) in 1923.)
Alpha Mu	1927–1941	University of Illinois Urbana-Champaign	Champaign, Illinois	Inactive	(Note: The chapter originated as Pi Delta Phi (local) in 1923.)
Alpha Nu	1928–1936	Lyon College	Batesville, Arkansas	Inactive	(Note: The chapter originated as Alpha Mu Alpha (local) before 1928.)
Alpha Xi	1929–1939	Miami University	Oxford, Ohio	Inactive	(Note: The chapter originated as Delta Xi (local) in 1925.)
Alpha Omicron	1929–1941	Simpson College	Indianola, Iowa	Inactive	(Note: The chapter originated as Zeta Tau Delta (local) in 1925.)
Alpha Pi	1929–1964	Baldwin Wallace University	Berea, Ohio	Merged (ΑΦ)	(Note: The chapter originated as Phi Lambda Sigma (local) in 1870. It became the Delta Upsilon chapter of Alpha Phi)
Alpha Rho	1929–1964	Louisiana State University	Baton Rouge, Louisiana	Merged (ΑΦ)	(Note: The chapter originated as Kappa Gamma (local) in 1923. It became Delta Tau chapter of Alpha Phi.)
Alpha Omicron	1929–1959	H. Sophie Newcomb Memorial College	New Orleans, Louisiana	Inactive	(Note: The chapter originated as Zeta Sigma (local) in 1926.)
Alpha Tau	1930–1964	University of Pittsburgh	Pittsburgh, Pennsylvania	Inactive	(Note: The chapter originated as Alpha Delta Sigma (local) in 1921. The chapter closed in 1964; no merger was effected.)
Alpha Upsilon	1931–1941	University of Nevada, Reno	Reno, Nevada	Inactive	(Note: The chapter originated as Sigma Alpha Omega (local) in 1921.)
Alpha Phi	1931–1936	Washburn University	Topeka, Kansas	Inactive	(Note: The chapter originated as Phi Sigma Omega (local) in 1918.)
Alpha Chi	1931–1935	University of Oklahoma	Norman, Oklahoma	Inactive	(Note: The chapter originated as Kappa Upsilon (local) in 1928.)
Alpha Psi	September 1931 – 1964	William Jewell College	Liberty, Missouri	Merged (ΖΤΑ)	(Note: The chapter originated as Iota Pi (local) in 1919. It became Delta Chi chapter of Zeta Tau Alpha.)
Alpha Omega	1932–1936	University of Washington	Seattle, Washington	Inactive	(Note: The chapter originated as the Kumtex Club (local) in 1921, which in 1922 became the Beta chapter of Pi Sigma Gamma, a small national that dissolved in 1932.)
Beta Alpha	1932–1964	Hunter College	Manhattan, New York City, New York	Withdrew (local)	(Note: The chapter originated as Epsilon Nu (local) in 1920, which in 1926 became the Gamma chapter of Pi Sigma Gamma, a small national that dissolved in 1932. It became the Beta Alpha chapter of Beta Sigma Omicron in 1932 but reverted to local status at the time of the 1964 merger with Zeta Tau Alpha.)
Beta Beta	1933–1964	Howard College	Homewood, Alabama	Merged (ΖΤΑ)	(Note: The chapter formed from Sigma Iota Chi, established in 1924 at Howard College, now called Samford University. Became Delta Psi chapter of Zeta Tau Alpha.)
Beta Gamma	1937–1964	Westminster College	New Wilmington, Pennsylvania	Merged (ΖΤΑ)	(Note: The chapter originated as Omicron Mu Gamma (local) in 1928. It became Delta Omega chapter of Zeta Tau Alpha.)
Beta Delta	1941–1964	Queens College, City University of New York	Flushing, Queens, New York	Withdrew (local)	(Note: The chapter originated as Chi Phi Delta (local) before 1941. It withdrew to form Beta Sigma Delta (local) in 1964, rather than participate in the national merger.)
Beta Epsilon	1946–1962	Pennsylvania State University	University Park, Pennsylvania	Inactive	(Note: The chapter originated as the Kallozetia Club (local) in 1945.)
Beta Zeta	1947–1959	Florida Southern College	Lakeland, Florida	Inactive	(Note: The chapter originated as Omega Delta Phi (local) in 1946.)
Beta Eta	May 1947 – 1959	Louisiana Tech University	Ruston, Louisiana	Inactive	
Beta Theta	1949–1964	University of Evansville	Evansville, Indiana	Merged (ΖΤΑ)	(Note: Became Zeta Alpha chapter of Zeta Tau Alpha.)
Beta Iota	1950–1964	Thiel College	Greenville, Pennsylvania	Merged (ΖΤΑ)	(Note: The chapter originated as Alpha Sigma Pi (local) in 1919. It became the Zeta Beta chapter of Zeta Tau Alpha.)
Beta Kappa	1951–1964	Indiana University of Pennsylvania	Indiana County, Pennsylvania	Merged (ΑΦ)	(Note: The chapter originated as Zeta Kappa Delta (local) in 1950. It became the Delta Phi chapter of Alpha Phi.)
Beta Lambda	1952–1964	Youngstown State University	Youngstown, Ohio	Merged (ΖΤΑ)	(Note: The chapter originated as a Beta Sigma Omicron colony in 1951. It became the Zeta Gamma chapter of Zeta Tau Alpha.)
Beta Mu	1954–1964	Cleveland State University	Cleveland, Ohio	Withdrew (local)	(Note: The chapter originated as Lambda Sigma Chi (local) in 1934 at Fenn College, now called Cleveland State University. It reverted to local status at the time of the national merger with Zeta Tau Alpha.)
Beta Nu	1961–1963	Waynesburg University	Waynesburg, Pennsylvania	Withdrew (ΦΣΣ)	(Note: The chapter withdrew to form Alpha Beta Nu (local) the year before the national merger with Zeta Tau Alpha. This chapter became the Gamma Epsilon chapter of Phi Sigma Sigma in 1972.)
