= Synodical College =

Synodical College may refer to various defunct schools in the United States associated with a synod, including:

- Florence Synodical Female College, Florence, Alabama
- Fulton Female Synodical College, Fulton, Missouri
- La Grange Synodical College, defunct college in Tennessee
- Mississippi Synodical College, Holly Springs, Mississippi
