= Logan College (disambiguation) =

Logan College was a Methodist women's college in Russellville, Kentucky.

Logan College may also refer to:

- Logan College of Chiropractic, former name of Logan University
- John A. Logan College, a community college in Carterville, Illinois
- Logan Collegians, a minor league baseball team
