= Kappa Delta Phi (junior sorority) =

American collegiate sorority (1921–1961)

- ΚΔΦ
- Founded: February 19, 1921; 105 years ago Stephens College
- Type: Social
- Affiliation: NJCP
- Status: Defunct
- Defunct date: 1961
- Emphasis: 2-year colleges
- Scope: National
- Motto: Ex amino
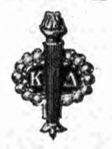
- Member badge
- Colors: Orchid, Bronze and Straw
- Flower: Orchid sweet pea
- Publication: The Torch
- Chapters: 9
- Headquarters: United States

Kappa Delta Phi (ΚΔΦ) was a national junior college sorority in the United States. It was established in 1921 at Stephens College in Columbia, Missouri. The sorority established at least nine chapters because going inactive in 1961. It was a member of the National Junior College Panhellenic.

== History ==
Kappa Delta Phi was founded on February 19, 1921, at Stephens College in Columbia, Missouri. It was established as a local social sorority. Its charter members were Julie Bondurant, Fannie Ellis Cocke, Georgia Cox, Dorothy Dunlap, Ethel Green, Dorothy Heggie, Mary Geraldine Holmes, Ellen Love, Ruth Marshall, Ruth Morgan, Ola V. Powell, Hallie Redman, Alice Sanders, Mary Staley, Eunice Thornhill, and Myrtle Williams. In April 1921, the sorority moved into a chapter house at 201 College Avenue in Columbia.

Kappa Delta Phi became a national junior college sorority with the establishment of a second chapter at Greenville Women's College in 1924, followed by chapters at the Hardin College and Belhaven College that same year. The sorority was a member of the National Junior College Panhellenic.

By 1930, the sorority had established eight chapters in the Southern United States. However, in 1936, only three of those chapters were still active. The Alpha chapter at Stephens College withdrew in 1938 and became the local sorority Kappa Alpha Phi.

Eta chapter at Blackstone College went inactive in 1943, leaving Theta chapter at Louisburg College to install a Kappa chapter at Tennessee Wesleyan College in 1944. Theta and Kappa chapters continued to be active until 1961, with the former going inactive and the latter becoming a chapter of Kappa Delta.

== Symbols ==
Kappa Delta Phi's motto was Ex amino. The sorority's colors were orchid, bronze, and straw. Its flower was the orchid sweet pea. Its magazine was The Torch.

== Chapters ==
Following are the known of Kappa Delta Phi sorority, with inactive chapters and institutions indicated in italics.

Chapter	Charter date and range	Institution	Location	Status	Ref.
Alpha	February 19, 1921 – 1938	Stephens College	Columbia, Missouri	Withdrew (local)	(Note: Chapter withdrew and became the local sorority Kappa Alpha Phi.)
Beta	1924–1936	Greenville Woman's College	Greenville, South Carolina	Inactive	
Gamma	April 13, 1924 – 1931	Hardin College and Conservatory of Music	Mexico, Missouri	Inactive	
Delta	1924–1932	Belhaven College	Jackson, Mississippi	Inactive	
Epsilon	1925–1926	Anderson College	Anderson, South Carolina	Inactive	
Zeta	1928–193x ?	Mississippi Synodical College	Holly Springs, Mississippi	Inactive	
Eta	1928–1943	Blackstone College	Blackstone, Virginia	Inactive	
Theta	May 1929 – 1961	Louisburg College	Louisburg, North Carolina	Inactive	(Note: Chapter formed from Delta Iota Kappa (local), established in 1919.)
Kappa	1944 – October 14, 1961	Tennessee Wesleyan College	Athens, Tennessee	Withdrew (ΚΔ)	(Note: Chapter formed from Pi Nu Lambda, established in 1921. In 1961, the chapter withdrew and became the Gamma Phi chapter of Kappa Delta.)

== See also ==
- College fraternities and sororities
- List of social sororities and women's fraternities
