= Kappa Delta Phi =

Kappa Delta Phi may refer to:

- Kappa Delta Phi (fraternity), an American social fraternity
- Kappa Delta Phi (junior sorority), a junior sorority
- Kappa Delta Phi National Affiliated Sorority, a sorority associated with Kappa Delta Phi fraternity
