= Cumnock Schools =

American educational organization in California

- Other names: Cumnock Junior College; Cumnock College; Cumnock School of Expression
- Type: Private
- Active: 1894–1942
- Founder: Adelaide "Addie" Murphy Grigg
- Accreditation: State of California
- Location: Los Angeles, California, United States
- Colors: Maroon and Gold
- Mascot: Maroons

Cumnock Schools was an American private educational organization in Los Angeles, California that included a junior college and primary, secondary, and vocational schools. Comnock Schools formed in 1930 with the merger of the Cumnock School of Expression, established in 1894, and the Macurda-Drisko School. M. C. Drisco and A. A. Macurda were the co-directors of Cumnock Schools, which stressed music and the arts. Cumnock Schools closed in 1942, in part due to World War II.

== History ==
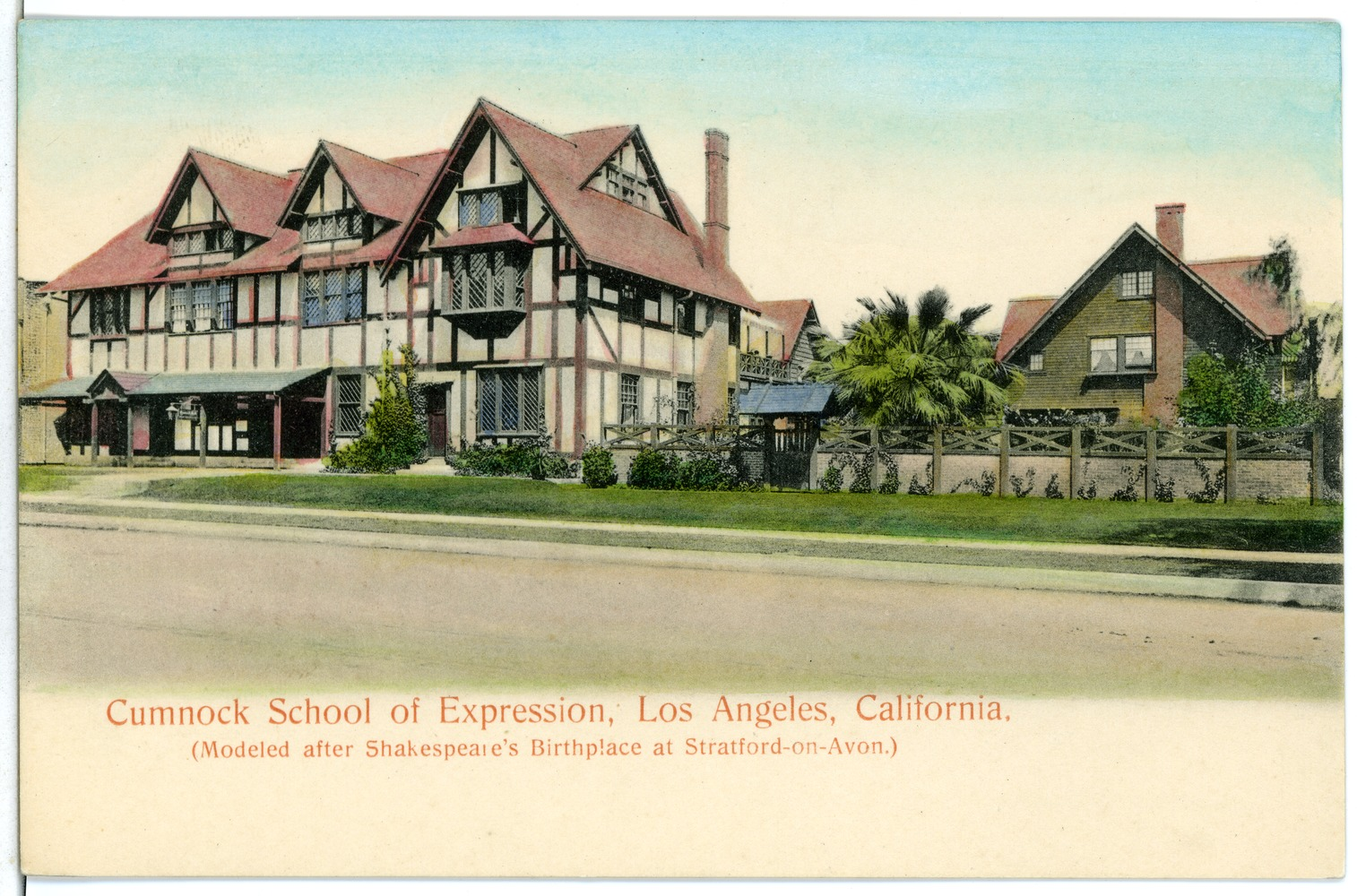
Comnock School of Expression, 1500 Figueroa Street

Adelaide "Addie" Murphy Grigg founded the Los Angeles School of Oratory for women in Los Angeles in 1894. Grigg was a graduate of the Northwestern University School of Oratory where she had been the assistant of Dr. Robert McLean Cumnock; she changed the school's name to the Cumnock School of Expression to honor her mentor. In 1902, the school moved to 1500 South Figueroa Street to a building modeled after Shakespeare's Birthplace in Stratford-upon-Avon. Kate Tupper Galpin added Cumnock Academy for Girls, a preparatory school, to the campus in April 1902.

Grigg died in January 1915, and Helen Augusta Brooks became the school's new headmistress, with her sister Anna Brooks Wyckoff as treasurer. In 1916, the school moved to Vermont Avenue in west central Los Angeles. After the Brooks sisters retired in 1930, the Cumnock School was sold and became coeducational.

Cumnock Schools formed in 1930 through the merger of the Cumnock School of Expression and the Macurda-Drisko Schools. The merger was facilitated by M. C. Drisco and A. A. Macurda, formerly of the Macurda-Drisko Schools. The transaction included securing a lease to own option for $300,000 on 4.75 acre property at 5353 West Third Street in Los Angeles. Drisco and Macurda were the co-directors of Cumnock Schools.

Raymond C. Brooks became the president of Cumnock School in August 1936, remaining in this position until it closed. Brooks had been head of the department of religion at Pomona College but had come to Cumnock to carry on the family tradition started by Helen Brooks. he intended to restore the school to it former status and, then, sell it. He called it Cumnock School and College. After seven years, Brooks had achieved his goal and found buyers for the school; however, the two men who were to take over the school were enlisted into the military for World War II.

Deciding that he was unlikely to sell the school during the war, Brooks closed the school rather than let it become more financially insecure. Cumnock Schools graduated its last high school and junior college classes, a total of 42 students, on June 13, 1942. The school closed for good after a summer session that ended on August 29, 1942. It had a total of 1,158 graduates.

== Campus ==
Cumnock Schools was located at 5353 West Third Street in Los Angeles, California. Its buildings were in English Tudor-style. Academic facilities included a numerous classrooms; chemistry, biology, and physics laboratories; art and music departments; a library, and a study hall. The campus included an auditorium, a dining room that seated 200, and a dormitory for forty girls. It also had space for archery, badminton, baseball, football, and tennis.

== Academics ==
Cumnock Schools continued and expanded the programs of its former institutions, offering a coeducational education for kindergarten through junior college. Its primary and secondary instructors were all certified. The Cumnock School was accredited by the State of California, starting in 1917.

Along with traditional subjects, the Cumnock Schools emphasized music and the arts. Olga Steeb, a pianist from Los Angeles, oversaw piano instruction. Harry Brenner, concert master of the Berlin opera, oversaw violin training. Hal Davidson Crane, head of the Bach Cantata Society, taught vocal classes, along with Amiee Spurr. The director of the college's art department was Henry Lovins, a muralist who was formerly head of the art department at the University of Southern California.

== Collegiate institutions ==
=== Cumnock School of Expression ===
Cumnock School of Expression was established in 1894 by Adelaide "Addie" Murphy Grigg as a professional school that trained students to become readers or teachers of expression. It taught dramatic art, English, oratory, and physical culture. Kate Tupper Galpin added the Cumnock Academy for Girls, a preparatory school, to the campus in April 1902. The school also included a junior department. Cumnock School became coeducational in 1928 and was sold in 1930.

Cumnock School of Expression was reestablished as a component of Cumnock Schools in 1930 under the leadership of Helen Crane Hardison and Robert Ethel Phillips. The new School of Expression taught diction, drama, public speaking, voice, and the allied arts. Both classes and private training were offered. The school accepted day and boarding students, but only offered housing for female students. It closed in 1942.

=== Cumnock Secretarial School ===
The Cumnock Secretarial School taught business courses to both male and female students, preparing them for a "higher class" of secretarial work. It closed sometime before Cumnock Schools ceased to operate in 1942.

=== Cumnock Junior College ===
Cumnock Junior College was established in 1928. It helped students who were turned away from traditional four-year colleges prepare to become junior transfer students. It merged with the Los Angeles Private Junior College to form Cumnock College in 1930. Los Angeles Private Junior College had previously been operated by Macurda-Drisko Schools.

=== Cumnock College ===
Cumnock College was formed from the merger of Cumnock Junior College and the Los Angeles Private Junior College in 1930. Despite the name change, it remained a two-year college, providing classes covering the first two years of college. The college opened on October 1, 1930.

Cumnock College admitted male and female students who were high school graduates. In 1932, it had 103 students. The college closed in 1942.

== Pre-college institutions ==
=== Primary schools ===
Cumnock schools also included a nursery school for ages two to four, a kindergarten, and an elementary school. In addition to the "regular classes", students were taught dancing, drama, French, and physical education. The primary schools were housed in two buildings on the Cumnock campus. These programs had ceased to exist sometime before Cumnock Schools closed in 1942.

=== Cumnock Junior High School ===
The junior high school taught students in grades seven and eight. The junior high school operated until Cumnock Schools closed in 1942.

=== Cumnock High School ===
Cumnock High School was formed in 1930 by the merger of the Cumnock Academy and the Los Angeles Private High School, previously operated by Macurda-Drisko Schools. The high school included housing for sixty female students.

In 1932, 36 students graduated from the high school, with many continuing at Cumnock College. The high school closed with the rest of Cumnock Schools in 1942.

== Student life ==
Cumnock College had a chapter of Phi Sigma Nu junior college fraternity. It also had chapters of the sororities Sigma Iota Chi and Theta Tau Epsilon. Its yearbook was the Cumnock Chronicle.

== Sports ==
Cumnock Schools had a football team that played against other high schools and junior colleges. Its football coach was Ford Palmer, a former football player at the University of Southern California. The team was called the Maroons and played in Gilmore Stadium. Its colors were maroon and gold. Cumnock was not a member of the California Interscholastic Federation Southern Section (CIFSS), but frequently played football against its members.

Cumnock also had basketball and track teams. It had a boxing team that was coached by Fidel LaBarba.

== Notable people ==
=== Alumni ===
- Bessie Bartlett Frankel (School of Expression), concert singer, composer, and clubwoman
- Martha Graham (School of Expression), dancer and choreographer
- Sharlot Hall (School of Expression), poet, journalist, and historian
- Gertrude Ross (School of Expression), composer and pianist who wrote music for films and stage

=== Faculty ===
- Kate Tupper Galpin, educator and founder of the Cumnock Academy for Girls
- Fidel LaBarba, boxing coach
- Anna Priscilla Risher, classical composer and director of music at the Cumnock School for Girls
- Olga Steeb, piano instructor
- Eliza Tupper Wilkes, chaplain of the Cumnock School of Expression

== See also ==
- List of colleges and universities in California
