= Theta Tau Epsilon =

American collegiate sorority (1921–1938)

- ΘΤΕ
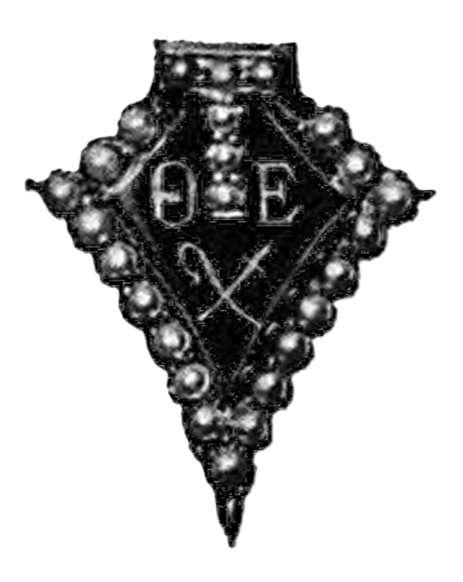
- Theta Tau Epsilon member's badge
- Founded: February 1, 1921; 105 years ago Stephens College
- Type: Social
- Former affiliation: NJCP; NPC
- Status: Defunct
- Defunct date: 1938
- Emphasis: 2-year colleges
- Scope: National
- Colors: Pink, Green, and Yellow
- Flower: Ophelia rose
- Publication: The Kite
- Chapters: 9
- Headquarters: United States

Theta Tau Epsilon (ΘΤΕ) was an American college sorority for two-year colleges. It was established in 1921 at Stephens College in Columbia, Missouri. The sorority established at least nine chapters before going inactive. It was an associate member of the National Panhellenic Congress and member of the National Junior College Panhellenic.

== History ==
Theta Tau Epsilon local sorority began organizing on February 20, 1920, at Stephens College, a junior college in Columbia, Missouri. The sorority was installed on February 19, 1921. Its founding members were Margaret Bigelowe, Vesper Gaines, Bessie Gibson, Opal Hunstead, May Conley Hunt, Dorothy Mitchell, Marjorie Mynatt, Lillian Patton, Charlotte Rainey, Ruth Sherman, Mary Ruth Smith, Mildred Tandy, Sarah Jane Toomay, Cordelia Trimble, Mary Allen Westcott, and Julia Whiteside.

Theta Tau Epsilon's purpose was "to develop every girl to her greatest ability, promote higher scholastic standards, promote school loyalty, promote fair play and to live by the highest of moral and social laws". One of the sorority's annual activities was to present the Theta Tau Epsilon Cup to a member of the senior class who embodied Stephen College's "Ten Ideals", including courtesy, love of scholarship, service, discipline, and honesty.

The local sorority added a second chapter at Hardin College in 1922, followed by a chapter at Fulton Female Synodical College in 1923. Eventually, the sorority expanded to include nine chapters by 1929, all located a junior colleges. It also had alumnae chapters.

Theta Tau Epsilon was governed by a grand council that was elected biennially at a national convention. The grand council consisted of a president, vice president, secretary, treasurer, and historian. The sorority held its 1936 conclave of national officers in Shreveport, Louisiana on June 16, 17, and 18. At the time, it was one of five national junior sororities.

Theta Tau Epsilon was an associate member of the National Panhellenic Congress and a member of the National Junior College Panhellenic. During the 1930s, the sorority's chapters gradually closed. It appears that it last chapter was Alpha at Stephens College, which became Theta Tau Omega (local) in 1938.

== Symbols ==
Theta Tau Epsilon's coat of arms consisted of a shield with reversed pall with seven stars, along with a crook, a Latin cross, and a rose. Above the shield was a lion.

Theta Tau Epsilon's kite-shaped badge was set in pearls. The sorority's colors were pink, green, and yellow. Its flower was the Ophelia rose. Its publication was The Kite.

== Chapters ==
Following is a list of Theta Tau Epsilon's chapters, with inactive chapters and institutions indicated in italics.

Chapter	Charter date and range	Institution	Location	Status	Ref.
Alpha	February 21, 1921 – 1938	Stephens College	Columbia, Missouri	Withdrew (local)	(Note: Withdrew and became Theta Tau Omega (local).)
Beta	1922–19xx ?	Hardin College	Mexico, Missouri	Inactive	
Gamma	1923–1928	Fulton Female Synodical College	Fulton, Missouri	Inactive	
Delta	1926–1932	Belhaven College	Jackson, Mississippi	Inactive	
Epsilon	1928–193x ?	Mississippi Synodical College	Holly Springs, Mississippi	Inactive	(Note: The college merged into Belhaven College in 1939, and its remaining students were moved to the Belhaven campus in Jackson, Mississippi.)
Zeta	1929–1936	Louisburg College	Louisburg, North Carolina	Inactive	(Note: Chapter formed from Pi Phi Pi, established in 1928.)
Eta	1929–193x ?	Dodd College	Shreveport, Louisiana	Inactive	(Note: Dodd College closed in 1949.)
Theta	1931–1936	Greenville Woman's College	Greenville, South Carolina	Inactive	
Iota	1931–193x ?	Cumnock College	Los Angeles, California	Inactive	

== See also ==
- List of social sororities and women's fraternities
