= List of Phi Sigma Sigma chapters =

Phi Sigma Sigma is a collegiate nonsectarian sorority in North America. In the following list, active chapters are indicated in bold and inactive chapters are in italics.

Chapter	Charter date and range	Institution	Location	Status	Ref.
Alpha	November 26, 1913 – 1976	Hunter College	New York City, New York	Inactive	
Beta	1918–1922, 1991–1996	Tufts University	Medford, Massachusetts	Inactive	(Note: Chapter formed from Sigma Phi Delta, established in 1917.)
Gamma	1918–1963	New York University	New York City, New York	Inactive	
**Delta**	1920–1935, 1951–1964, 1984–2002, 2010	University at Buffalo	Buffalo, New York	Active	(Note: Chapter formed from Sigma Phi, established in 1917. After dormancy, it was reformed in 1951 from Kappa Delta Phi, which was established in 1950.)
**Epsilon**	1920–1971, 2008	Adelphi University	Garden City, New York	Active	
Zeta	1921–1973	University of California, Los Angeles	Los Angeles, California	Inactive	
Eta	1922–1943, 1958–1970	University of Michigan	Ann Arbor, Michigan	Inactive	(Note: Chapter formed from the Phydelians, established in 1921.)
**Theta**	May 18, 1923 – 2010; 2013	University of Illinois Urbana-Champaign	Champaign, Illinois	Active	(Note: Chapter formed from Rho Beta Iota, established in 1920.)
Iota	1924–1976	University of Pittsburgh	Pittsburgh, Pennsylvania	Inactive	(Note: Chapter formed from Sigma Lambda Chi Iota, established in 1923.)
Kappa	1924–1971, 1987–1994, 1998–2020	George Washington University	Washington, D.C.	Inactive	(Note: Chapter formed from Phi Lambda Mu, established in 1920.)
Lambda	1926–1944, 1966–1972	University of Cincinnati	Cincinnati, Ohio	Inactive	(Note: Chapter formed from Sigma Tau Alpha, established in 1924.)
Mu	1926–1943, 1957–1966	University of California, Berkeley	Berkeley, California	Inactive	
Nu	1926–1933, 1947–1970, 1973–2002, 2004–2010	University of Pennsylvania	Philadelphia, Pennsylvania	Inactive	(Note: Chapter formed from Sigma Phi Delta, established in 1920.)
**Xi**	1926	Temple University	Philadelphia, Pennsylvania	Active	(Note: Chapter formed from Sigma Phi Delta, established in 1921.)
Omicron	1927–1933	Louisiana State University	Baton Rouge, Louisiana	Inactive	(Note: Chapter formed from Pi Delta, established in 1924.)
**Pi**	1927–1975, 2001	Syracuse University	Syracuse, New York	Active	(Note: Chapter formed from Delta Nu Delta Pi, established in 1924. After going dormant, it reformed from Gamma Delta Theta.)
Rho	1928–1938, 1947–1976	Ohio State University	Columbus, Ohio	Inactive	(Note: Chapter formed from Iota Kappa, established in 1927. After dormancy, it was reformed in 1947 from Zeta Mu (local), which was established in 1945.)
Sigma	1929–1933, 1966–1970	Long Island University	Brookville, New York	Inactive	(Note: Chapter formed from Aota Club (local), established in 1928.)
Tau	1929–1933	University of Texas at Austin	Austin, Texas	Inactive	
Upsilon	1930–1955	University of Manitoba	Winnipeg, Manitoba, Canada	Inactive	
Phi	1930–1948, 1965–1969	University of Wisconsin–Madison	Madison, Wisconsin	Inactive	(Note: Chapter formed from Sigma (local), established in 1924.)
Chi	1932–1943	University of Utah	Salt Lake City, Utah	Inactive	(Note: Chapter formed from Delta Theta Chi, established in 1924.)
Psi	1934–1946, 1971–1980	Sophie Newcomb College	New Orleans, Louisiana	Inactive	(Note: Chapter formed at H. Sophie Newcomb Memorial College, which is now part of Tulane University.)
Omega	1935–1956	University of Missouri	Columbia, Missouri	Inactive	(Note: Chapter formed from Phi Delta Pi, established in 1931.)
**Beta Alpha**	1936	University of Maryland, College Park	College Park, Maryland	Active	(Note: Chapter formed from Beta Pi Sigma, established in 1930.)
Beta Beta	1940–199x ?	University of Washington	Seattle, Washington	Inactive	(Note: Chapter formed from Chi Rho Delta, established in 1939.)
Beta Gamma	1941–1975	Boston University	Boston, Massachusetts	Inactive	(Note: Chapter formed from Sigma Beta Upsilon, established in 1920)
Beta Delta	1941–1951, 1969–197?, 1991–1994	Ohio University	Athens, Ohio	Inactive	(Note: Chapter formed from the Tower Club (local), established in 1939.)
Beta Epsilon	1943–1972	University of Connecticut	Storrs, Connecticut	Inactive	(Note: Chapter formed from Theta Psi, established in 1932.)
Beta Zeta	1945–1952	University of Southern California	Los Angeles, California	Inactive	(Note: Chapter formed from Sigma Tau, established in 1944.)
**Beta Eta**	1946–1973, 2015	Pennsylvania State University	State College, Pennsylvania	Active	(Note: Chapter formed from Alethia (local), established in 1944.)
Beta Theta	1947–1975, 1985–1991	University of Miami	Coral Gables, Florida	Inactive	(Note: Chapter formed from Adelphi (local), established in 1946.)
Beta Iota	1947–1953	Southern Methodist University	University Park, Texas	Inactive	(Note: Chapter formed from Delta Rho (local), established in 1936.)
Beta Kappa	1947–1953	Florida Southern College	Lakeland, Florida	Inactive	(Note: Chapter formed from Phi Beta Gamma, established in 1945.)
Beta Lambda	1950–1973	Wayne State University	Detroit, Michigan	Inactive	(Note: Chapter formed from Sigma Theta Delta, established in 1926.)
Beta Mu	1952–1957	University of Kentucky	Lexington, Kentucky	Inactive	(Note: Chapter formed from Tau Alpha Pi, established in 1945.)
Beta Nu	1954–1970	Brooklyn College	Brooklyn, New York	Inactive	(Note: Chapter formed from Lambda Gamma Phi, established in 1930.)
Beta Xi	1954–1970, 2001–2023	Cornell University	Ithaca, New York	Inactive	
Beta Omicron				Unassigned	
**Beta Pi**	1956–1971; 19xx ?	Queens College, City University of New York	Queens, New York	Active	(Note: Chapter formed from Upsilon Phi (local), established in 1938.)
**Beta Rho**	1960	Drexel University	Philadelphia, Pennsylvania	Active	(Note: Chapter formed from Omega Phi, established in 1959.)
Beta Sigma	1962–1963	University of Tampa	Tampa, Florida	Inactive	
Beta Tau	1965–1973	California State University, Northridge	Northridge, Los Angeles, California	Inactive	(Note: Chapter formed from Beta Tau (local), established in 1961.)
Beta Upsilon	1962–19xx ?, 1983–2021	American University	Washington, D.C.	Inactive	(Note: Chapter formed from Kappa Theta Tau, established in 1959.)
Beta Phi	1965–19xx ?	Georgia State University	Atlanta, Georgia	Inactive	
Beta Chi	1966–1973	University of Wisconsin–Milwaukee	Milwaukee, Wisconsin	Inactive	
Beta Psi	1967–19xx ?, 1989–1993	University of Florida	Gainesville, Florida	Inactive	
Alpha Alpha	1968–1973	Lehman College	Bronx, New York	Inactive	
Beta Omega	1969–2014	Portland State University	Portland, Oregon	Inactive	
Gamma Alpha	1969–1973, 1991–xxxx ?	Indiana University of Pennsylvania	Indiana, Pennsylvania	Inactive	(Note: Chapter formed from Sigma Phi Sigma, established in 1965.)
Gamma Beta	1970–xxxx ?	Suffolk University	Boston, Massachusetts	Inactive	
**Gamma Gamma**	1971	Penn West Clarion	Clarion, Pennsylvania	Active	(Note: Chapter formed from Beta Xi Omega, established in 1968.)
Gamma Delta	1971–xxxx ?	Rutgers University–Camden	Camden, New Jersey	Inactive	(Note: Chapter formed from Delta Rho, established in 1951.)
Gamma Epsilon	1972–19xx ?	Waynesburg University	Waynesburg, Pennsylvania	Inactive	(Note: The chapter originated in 1961 as the Beta Nu chapter of Beta Sigma Omicron, a national sorority that was absorbed by Zeta Tau Alpha in 1963. Rather than merge, the chapter reverted to local status as Alpha Beta Nu (local) for nine years before being chartered as the Gamma Epsilon chapter.)
**Gamma Zeta**	1973–1978, 1992	University of Rhode Island	Kingston, Rhode Island	Active	(Note: Chapter formed from Lambda Delta Pi, established in 1956. After dormancy, it was reformed from Rho Psi Delta, which was established in 1990.)
Gamma Eta	1976–19xx ?	University of Tennessee at Chattanooga	Chattanooga, Tennessee	Inactive	(Note: Chapter formed from Pi Omicron (local), established in 1973.)
Gamma Theta	1976–xxxx ?	Rensselaer Polytechnic Institute	TTroy, New York	Inactive	
**Gamma Iota**	1977	Worcester Polytechnic Institute	Worcester, Massachusetts	Active	
Gamma Kappa	1977–2018	Towson University	Towson, Maryland	Inactive	
Gamma Lambda	1977–19xx ?, 200x ?–2013	University of Wisconsin–Superior	Superior, Wisconsin	Inactive	
**Gamma Mu**	1979	Clarkson University	Potsdam, New York	Active	
**Gamma Nu**	1978–2002, 2010	Rutgers University–New Brunswick	New Brunswick, New Jersey	Active	
**Gamma Xi**	1978	Widener University	Chester, Pennsylvania	Active	(Note: Chapter formed from Omega Psi, established in 1977.)
Gamma Omicron	1979–1983	Fort Hays State University	Hays, Kansas	Inactive	
**Gamma Pi**	1979	University of Maryland, Baltimore County	Catonsville, Maryland	Active	
Gamma Rho	1979–19xx ?	Rochester Institute of Technology	Rochester, New York	Inactive	
Gamma Sigma	1979–2011	Virginia Commonwealth University	Richmond, Virginia	Inactive	
**Gamma Tau**	1979	Northern Kentucky University	Highland Heights, Kentucky	Active	
Gamma Upsilon	1979–1983, 199?–2006	New England College	Henniker, New Hampshire	Inactive	
Gamma Phi	1980–1992	Fairleigh Dickinson University	Rutherford, New Jersey	Inactive	
Gamma Chi	1981–xxxx ?	Rutgers University–Newark	Newark, New Jersey	Inactive	
**Gamma Psi**	1981	McDaniel College	Westminster, Maryland	Active	(Note: Chapter formed from Sigma Sigma Tau, established in 1922.)
Gamma Omega	1981–200x ?	East Stroudsburg University of Pennsylvania	East Stroudsburg, Pennsylvania	Inactive	
Delta Alpha	1981–1983, 1995–2012	Eastern Michigan University	Ypsilanti, Michigan	Inactive	
Delta Beta	1981–2021	University of Rochester	Rochester, New York	Inactive	
**Delta Gamma**	1981	San Francisco State University	San Francisco, California	Active	
**Delta Delta**	1981	Linfield University	McMinnville, Oregon	Active	
Delta Epsilon	1981–2019	University of Windsor	Windsor, Ontario, Canada	Inactive	(Note: Chapter formed from Chi Delphian, established in 1980.)
**Delta Zeta**	1982	Stevens Institute of Technology	Hoboken, New Jersey	Active	
**Delta Eta**	1982–2007, 2013	University of Delaware	Newark, Delaware	Active	
**Delta Theta**	1983	Oakland University	Rochester Hills, Michigan	Active	
**Delta Iota**	1984	Central Michigan University	Mount Pleasant, Michigan	Active	
**Delta Kappa**	1984	Florida International University	University Park, Florida	Active	(Note: Chapter formed from Chi Delta Epsilon, established in 1978.)
**Delta Lambda**	1984	Muhlenberg College	Allentown, Pennsylvania	Active	
**Delta Mu**	1985	William Paterson University	Wayne, New Jersey	Active	
**Delta Nu**	1985	Iona University	New Rochelle, New York	Active	
**Delta Xi**	1985	Binghamton University	Binghamton, New York	Active	
Delta Omicron	1985–1998	Eastern Illinois University	Charleston, Illinois	Active	
Delta Pi	1986–1987	University of Dayton	Dayton, Ohio	Inactive	(Note: Chapter formed from Gamma Gamma Kappa, established in 1962.)
Delta Rho	1986–19xx ?	University of Rio Grande	Rio Grande, Ohio	Inactive	(Note: Chapter formed from Chi Omega Alpha, established in 1959.)
**Delta Sigma**	1987	SUNY Brockport	Brockport, New York	Active	
Delta Tau	1987–20xx ?	University at Albany, SUNY	Albany, New York	Inactive	(Note: Chapter formed from Chi Sigma Theta, established in 1908.)
Delta Upsilon	1987–201?	Siena Heights University	Adrian, Michigan	Inactive	
**Delta Phi**	1987	Monmouth University	West Long Branch, New Jersey	Active	
**Delta Chi**	1987	Shippensburg University of Pennsylvania	Shippensburg, Pennsylvania	Active	
Delta Psi	1987–2016	University of West Florida	Pensacola, Florida	Inactive	
**Delta Omega**	December 12, 1987	Pace University	Pleasantville, New York	Active	
**Epsilon Alpha**	1988	Illinois State University	Normal, Illinois	Active	
**Epsilon Beta**	1988	Ferris State University	Big Rapids, Michigan	Active	
Epsilon Gamma	1988–199?	Millersville University of Pennsylvania	Millersville, Pennsylvania	Inactive	(Note: Chapter formed from Kappa Delta Phi, established in 1967.)
Epsilon Delta	1988–2015	Chapman University	Orange, California	Inactive	
**Epsilon Epsilon**	1988	California State University, Bakersfield	Bakersfield, California	Active	
Epsilon Zeta	1988-2021	Bloomsburg University of Pennsylvania	Bloomsburg, Pennsylvania	Inactive	(Note: Chapter absorbed Phi Delta (local).)
Epsilon Eta	1988–2008	Stony Brook University	Stony Brook, New York	Inactive	
**Epsilon Theta**	1988	Montclair State University	Montclair, New Jersey	Active	(Note: Chapter absorbed Sigma Tau Nu (local).)
**Epsilon Iota**	1989	Bridgewater State University	Bridgewater, Massachusetts	Active	(Note: Chapter formed from Lambda Gamma Chi, established in 1987.)
**Epsilon Kappa**	April 1, 1989	Hofstra University	Hempstead, New York	Active	(Note: Chapter formed from Wreath & Foil (local), established in 1937.)
Epsilon Lambda	1989–1999	Frostburg State University	Frostburg, Maryland	Inactive	(Note: Chapter formed from Delta Delta, established in 1981.)
Epsilon Mu	1989–xxxx ?	Hamilton College	Hamilton, New York	Inactive	
**Epsilon Nu**	1989	State University of New York at Oswego	Oswego, New York	Active	
**Epsilon Xi**	1989	State University of New York at Oneonta	Oneonta, New York	Active	
**Epsilon Omicron**	1989	St. John's University	Queens, New York City, New York	Active	
Epsilon Pi	1989–2003	Southern Connecticut State University	New Haven, Connecticut	Inactive	(Note: Chapter formed from Sigma Mu Beta.)
**Epsilon Rho**	1989	York College of Pennsylvania	York, Pennsylvania	Active	(Note: Chapter formed from Alpha Theta Chi, established in 1977.)
Epsilon Sigma	1990–2022	Virginia Wesleyan University	Norfolk, Virginia	Inactive	
**Epsilon Tau**	1990	Pennsylvania Western University, California	California, Pennsylvania	Active	
Epsilon Upsilon	1990–2011	State University College at Buffalo	Buffalo, New York	Inactive	
**Epsilon Phi**	1990	Radford University	Radford, Virginia	Active	
**Epsilon Chi**	1990	Indiana University Southeast	New Albany, Indiana	Active	(Note: Chapter formed from Theta Chi Omega (local).)
**Epsilon Psi**	1990	Western Illinois University	Macomb, Illinois	Active	
Epsilon Omega	1990–2014	Utica College	Utica, New York	Inactive	
Zeta Alpha	1990–2023	Woodbury University	Burbank, California	Inactive	
Zeta Beta	1990–2008	Rowan University	Glassboro, New Jersey	Inactive	
Zeta Gamma	1990–2024	West Chester University	West Chester, Pennsylvania	Inactive	
**Zeta Delta**	1991	Bentley University	Waltham, Massachusetts	Active	
Zeta Epsilon	1991–2008	Bryant University	Smithfield, Rhode Island	Inactive	(Note: Chapter formed from Alpha Phi Kappa, established in 1946.)
**Zeta Zeta**	1991	Quinnipiac University	Hamden, Connecticut	Active	
Zeta Eta	1991–2022	Carleton University	Ottawa, Ontario, Canada	Inactive	(Note: Chapter formed from Pi Theta Phi, established in 1987.)
**Zeta Theta**	1991	Fairleigh Dickinson University	Madison, New Jersey	Active	(Note: Chapter formed from Xi Delta (local), established in 1987.)
Zeta Iota	1991–1993	Albright College	Reading, Pennsylvania	Inactive	
**Zeta Kappa**	1991	University of Pittsburgh at Johnstown	Johnstown, Pennsylvania	Active	
Zeta Lambda	1991–2018	Johnson & Wales University	Providence, Rhode Island	Inactive	(Note: Chapter formed from Chi Lambda Sigma Sisters (local), established in 1989.)
Zeta Mu	1991–2007	Florida Atlantic University	Boca Raton, Florida	Inactive	(Note: Chapter formed from Delta Chi Omega, established in 1987.)
**Zeta Nu**	1991	Slippery Rock University	Slippery Rock, Pennsylvania	Active	(Note: Chapter formed from Tau Alpha Lambda (local).)
**Zeta Xi**	1991	Canisius University	Buffalo, New York	Active	
**Zeta Omicron**	1992	Kutztown University of Pennsylvania	Kutztown, Pennsylvania	Active	(Note: Chapter formed from Zeta Chi Theta, established in 1989.)
Zeta Pi	1992–2016	The College of New Jersey	Ewing Township, New Jersey	Inactive	(Note: Chapter formed from Philomathean Sigma (local), established in 1897.)
**Zeta Rho**	1992	Fitchburg State University	Fitchburg, Massachusetts	Active	
Zeta Sigma	1992–20xx ?	Averett University	Danville, Virginia	Inactive	(Note: Chapter formed from Sigma Pi Omega.)
**Zeta Tau**	1992	Loyola University Chicago	Chicago, Illinois	Active	
Zeta Upsilon	1992–1996	Trine University	Angola, Indiana	Inactive	(Note: Chapter withdrew and became the local sorority, Phi Sigma.)
Zeta Phi	1992–19xx ?	Western Connecticut State University	Danbury, Connecticut	Inactive	
**Zeta Chi**	1992	Stevenson University	Owings Mills, Maryland	Active	
Zeta Psi	1993–200x ?	Bradley University	Peoria, Illinois	Inactive	
**Zeta Omega**	1993-2025	University of Michigan–Dearborn	Dearborn, Michigan	Inactive	(Note: Chapter formed from Alpha Gamma Omega, established in 1990.)
**Theta Alpha**	1993-2025	Northern Michigan University	Marquette, Michigan	Inactive	
**Theta Beta**	1993	Coastal Carolina University	Conway, South Carolina	Active	(Note: Chapter formed from Delta Phi Omega, established in 1991.)
Theta Gamma	1993–2021	Gannon University	Erie, Pennsylvania	Inactive	
**Theta Delta**	1993	University of Illinois Chicago	Chicago, Illinois	Active	
Theta Epsilon	1993–200x ?	State University of New York at Cortland	Cortland, New York	Inactive	
**Theta Zeta**	1994	Keene State College	Keene, New Hampshire	Active	(Note: Chapter formed from Phi Sigma Beta.)
**Theta Eta**	1994	Rider University	Lawrence Township, New Jersey	Active	
Theta Theta	1994–200x ?	Indiana University South Bend	South Bend, Indiana	Inactive	
**Theta Iota**	1994	University of Michigan–Flint	Flint, Michigan	Active	(Note: Chapter formed from Sigma Phi Upsilon, established in 1991.)
Theta Kappa	1994–xxxx ?	Emerson College	Boston, Massachusetts	Inactive	
Theta Lambda	1994–2014	LIU Post	Brookville, New York	Inactive	(Note: Chapter formed from Philomathean Sigma (local).)
**Theta Mu**	1994	California State University, Stanislaus	Turlock, California	Active	
Theta Nu	1995–2024	University of Findlay	Findlay, Ohio	Inactive	
**Theta Xi**	1996	Nova Southeastern University	Fort Lauderdale, Florida	Active	(Note: Chapter absorbed Zeta Pi (local).)
Theta Omicron	1996–200x ?	University of Toledo	Toledo, Ohio	Inactive	
Theta Pi	1996–200x ?	Shepherd University	Shepherdstown, West Virginia	Inactive	(Note: Chapter formed from Kappa Tau Epsilon, established in 1982.)
Theta Rho	1996–2022	University of Virginia's College at Wise	Wise, Virginia	Inactive	
**Theta Sigma**	1996	University of Massachusetts Dartmouth	Dartmouth, Massachusetts	Active	
Theta Tau	1996–2018	Lebanon Valley College	Annville Township, Pennsylvania	Inactive	
**Theta Upsilon**	1996	University of La Verne	La Verne, California	Active	(Note: Chapter formed from Phi Theta Chi, established in 1992.)
Theta Phi	1996–2005	College of Staten Island	Staten Island, New York City, New York	Inactive	(Note: Chapter formed from Sigma Iota Delta, established in 1993.)
**Theta Chi**	1997	California State University, Sacramento	Sacramento, California	Active	(Note: Chapter formed from Sigma Omega Chi, established in 1991.)
**Theta Psi**	1998	Alma College	Alma, Michigan	Active	
**Theta Omega**	1998	Niagara University	Lewiston, New York	Active	
**Iota Alpha**	1998	Saginaw Valley State University	University Center, Michigan	Active	
Iota Beta	2001–2023	Quincy University	Quincy, Illinois	Inactive	
Iota Gamma	2001–2015	California State University, Dominguez Hills	Carson, California	Inactive	
Iota Delta	2002–2018	Central Connecticut State University	New Britain, Connecticut	Inactive	(Note: Chapter was suspended in 2018 through September 2022.)
Iota Epsilon	2003–2022	Indiana University Kokomo	Kokomo, Indiana	Inactive	
**Iota Zeta**	2004	University of Minnesota Duluth	Duluth, Minnesota	Active	(Note: Chapter formed from Delta Omega Lambda, established in 2001.)
**Iota Eta**	2005	Florida Institute of Technology	Melbourne, Florida	Active	(Note: Chapter formed from Delta Psi Sigma.)
Iota Theta	2006–2018	Barry University	Miami Shores, Florida	Inactive	
**Iota Iota**	2007	Grand Valley State University	Allendale, Michigan	Active	
**Iota Kappa**	2007	University of Colorado Colorado Springs	Colorado Springs, Colorado	Active	
Iota Lambda	2007–2008	Metropolitan State College of Denver	Denver, Colorado	Inactive	
**Iota Mu**	2007	University of New Haven	West Haven, Connecticut	Active	
**Iota Nu**	2009	Sacred Heart University	Fairfield, Connecticut	Active	(Note: Chapter formed from Phi Omega Tau, established in 1994.)
**Iota Xi**	2010	Sonoma State University	Rohnert Park, California	Active	(Note: Chapter formed from Omega Sigma Alpha, established in 2007.)
**Iota Omicron**	2011	Capital University	Bexley, Ohio	Active	(Note: Chapter formed from Chi Theta Pi, established in 1962.)
**Iota Pi**	2012	Salem State University	Salem, Massachusetts	Active	
**Iota Rho**	2014	Saint Joseph's University	Philadelphia, Pennsylvania	Active	
**Iota Sigma**	2015	Farmingdale State College	East Farmingdale, New York	Active	
**Iota Tau**	2015	Miami University	Oxford, Ohio	Active	
**Iota Upsilon**	2016	University of New Hampshire	Durham, New Hampshire	Active	
**Iota Phi**	2017	Lindenwood University	St. Charles, Missouri	Active	
**Iota Chi**	2018	James Madison University	Harrisonburg, Virginia	Active	
