= James Cannon Jr. =

American bishop (1864–1944)

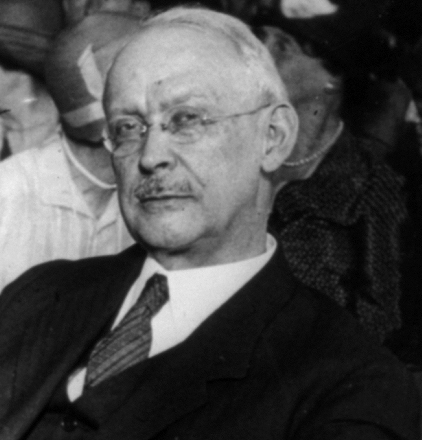
- Cannon in 1930
- Church: Methodist Episcopal Church, South
- Elected: 1918

Orders
- Ordination: 1888

Personal details
- Born: November 13, 1864 Salisbury, Maryland, U.S.
- Died: September 6, 1944 (aged 79) Chicago, Illinois, U.S.
- Buried: Hollywood Cemetery (Richmond, Virginia)
- Spouse: Lura Virginia Bennett (m. 1888, died)
- Occupation: Bishop, temperance movement leader
- Education: Randolph–Macon College (A.B., DDiv); Princeton University (A.M.)

James Cannon Jr. (November 13, 1864 – September 6, 1944) was an American bishop of the Methodist Episcopal Church, South, elected in 1918. He was a prominent leader in the temperance movement in the United States in the 1920s, until derailed by scandal. H. L. Mencken said in 1934: "Six years ago he was the undisputed boss of the United States. Congress was his troop of Boy Scouts, and Presidents trembled whenever his name was mentioned.... But since that time there has been a violent revolution, and his whole world is in collapse."

== Birth and family ==
Cannon was born on November 13, 1864, in Salisbury, Maryland, the son of James and Lydia R. (Pimrose) Cannon. He married Miss Lura Virginia Bennett of Louisa County, Virginia, on August 1, 1888, who was the daughter of William W. Bennett, President of Randolph-Macon College from 1877 to 1886.

== Education ==
Cannon was educated in the schools of Salisbury. He earned his A.B. degree from Randolph–Macon College in 1884. He earned his A.M. from Princeton University in 1889.

The degree of Doctor of Divinity was conferred upon Cannon in 1903 by Randolph-Macon College. Princeton University awarded him an honorary D.D. degree.

== Ordained ministry ==
Cannon was admitted on trial by the Virginia Annual Conference of the M.E. Church, South in 1888. He served the following appointments: Charlotte Circuit (1888–89), Newport News (1889–91) and Farmville (1891–94). He then became the Principal of the Blackstone Female Institute (1894-1911), and of the Blackstone College for Girls (1914-1918). He also served as the editor of the Baltimore-Richmond Christian Advocate, a periodical of his denomination, beginning in 1904. Cannon also was the Secretary of Education of his annual conference for some years.

== Temperance Movement ==
Cannon was the Superintendent of the Virginia State Anti-Saloon League, beginning in 1909, as well as Legislative Superintendent of the Anti-Saloon League of America. His appointment as bishop in 1918 gave him nationwide influence as he worked zealously to achieve national prohibition through the Eighteenth Amendment.

After the death of Anti-Saloon League leader Wayne Wheeler in 1927, Cannon, chairman of the Methodist Board of Temperance and Social Service, emerged as the most powerful leader of the temperance movement in the United States.

== Virginia politics ==
Cannon worked closely with the "Ring," the dominant conservative faction in Virginia politics, headed by Senator Thomas Staples Martin. The Ring dropped its opposition to prohibition and allowed the state to go dry in 1915, Cannon's first great triumph. Senator Carter Glass became his bitter enemy and started finding irregularities in the bishop's finances, discovering that Cannon, while president of Blackstone College (a small private girls' school in Virginia), had purchased a large quantity of flour in 1917 and, taking advantage of wartime shortages, had resold it not long after at a considerable profit shortly after he became bishop in 1918. Glass kept the information secret. Cannon's national activities in the 1920s reduced his visibility and power in Virginia. In 1921, the old Ring dissolved, replaced by the "Byrd Organization" of Harry Flood Byrd, Sr., which controlled the state for decades.

When the 1928 Democratic Convention chose wet leader Alfred E. Smith for president, Cannon was outraged at this "betrayal" of the dry cause, and helped organize the Anti-Smith Democratic movement in the South. Cannon strongly criticized Smith, calling him "the Cocktail President", who lived in the "sneering, ridiculing, nullifying...foreign-populated city of New York." Soon Virginia and upper South states were leaning toward Republican Herbert Hoover and he did carry them. However, the new Virginia machine led by Byrd and Glass supported Smith and decided Cannon had to be destroyed for ruining party unity in the Solid South. Glass sent investigators to look into Cannon's financial dealings. Cannon, who had never been a candidate for political office, assumed Hoover's victory in Virginia made the state ripe for himself, and spread rumors he would challenge Glass for the Senate seat. He supported a coalition of Anti-Smith Democrats and Republicans to win the governorship for Dr. William Moseley Brown of Washington and Lee College.

== Personality and character ==
One biographer described Cannon as an unpleasant and deceitful person. Although he "loved power and prestige, profit and pleasure," Cannon was a distant, dour, and aloof individual. One Anti-saloon League colleague described him as "cold as a snake"; and another, after working closely with Cannon for forty years, reported having never seen him laugh and rarely seen him even smile.

Glass released information that Cannon had been engaged in shady or illegal stock market manipulations. Fellow bishops called for a church investigation. Reports that he had used Methodist church money to support the anti-Smith Democrats in 1928 led to federal investigations. Although Cannon proclaimed his innocence, the disclosure of the wartime hoarding meant that the charges were mounting faster than his friends could deny them. Cannon's preferred candidate was defeated in the contest for the Virginia governorship; meanwhile, Glass kept pushing for more action.

In 1930, the bishops decided to bring Cannon to trial before a church court, which voted to find him not guilty by a vote of 54 to 11. Then the national newspapers published private letters between Cannon and his secretary showing they were having an affair before his first wife died. The bishops reopened the case and the church again voted not to convict its bishop, this time from the adultery charges.

Still, Cannon was not out of legal trouble. In October 1931, a federal grand jury brought criminal charges against Cannon for violating federal election laws, alleging he borrowed $65,000 for the campaign but kept $48,000 for himself. After a complex series of trials and appeals Cannon was found not guilty in 1934, but the revelations had destroyed his reputation. The highly publicized episodes left Cannon's reputation ruined and helped discredit the prohibition movement as immoral, contributing to the repeal of prohibition.

== Death and burial ==
Cannon died September 6, 1944, in Chicago and is buried at Hollywood Cemetery in Richmond, Virginia.

== See also ==
- List of bishops of the United Methodist Church
- Scientific Temperance Federation
- William E. Johnson
- Wayne Wheeler
- Billy Sunday
