= Zeta Mu Epsilon =

American college junior sorority

- ΖΜΕ
- Zeta Mu Epsilon member's badge
- Founded: February 29, 1921; 105 years ago Stephens College
- Type: Social
- Affiliation: NJCP
- Status: Defunct
- Scope: National
- Motto: Zeamus Mura Emosa
- Colors: Lavender and Silver
- Flower: Lilac and violet
- Jewel: Diamond and pearl
- Publication: The Evergreen
- Chapters: 15
- Members: 700+ lifetime
- Headquarters: United States

Zeta Mu Epsilon (ΖΜΕ) was an American junior collegiate sorority. It was established in 1921 at Stephens College in Columbia, Missouri. The sorority chartered at least fifteen chapters before going defunct. It was a member of the National Junior College Panhellenic.

== History ==
Zeta Mu Epsilon sorority was established on February 29, 1921, at Stephens College in Columbia, Missouri. Its founders adopted the sorority's constitution, bylaws, coat of arms, and ritual. It was established as a social sorority for junior colleges. Its purpose was "to ensure true friendship, to strive to attain the high ideals as symbolized by our pins and the further in every way the interest of our Alma Mater, always doing something for others, through our influence, building up the morale of the student body, and above all, the encouragement of better womanhood." By 1923, it had established a chapter house at 8 College Avenue.

In 1927, Zeta Mu Epsilon became a national sorority with the establishment of chapters at Logan College in Russellville, Kentucky; Greenbrier College in Lewisburg, West Virginia; and Belhaven College in Jackson, Mississippi. It was admitted to the National Junior College Panhellenic in March 26, 1927. At the time, it was the oldest member of the council.

The sorority's officers were elected at national conventions held biennially in June on even-numbered years. The sorority held a national convention in June 1928 in St. Louis, Missouri.

A chapter was chartered at the Greenville Women's College in 1928, Millersburg College in 1930, and Blackstone College for Girls and the College of Marshall. The sorority also established the Kansas City Alumnae Chapter. The chapter at Logan College closed with the college in 1931. This was followed by the closure of the Belhaven College chapter in 1932 and Greenville's Women's College in 1936.

In 1939, Zeta Mu Epsilon had initiated 700 members and chartered eight collegiate chapters and three alumnae chapters, with five collegiate chapters being inactive. The sorority held its tenth biennial convention in Washington, D.C. in June 1938. Also in 1938, the Alpha chapter at Stephens College closed. However, at least four additional chapters were chartered between 1939 and 1949. In 1949, its Grand Chapter was located in West Virginia.

The last known chapter to be chartered at Brandywine Junior College on January 15, 1967. That chapter hosted the nineteenth biennial convention of Zeta Mu Epsilon in April 1967. The sorority last chapter closed in the 1980s.

== Symbols ==
Zeta Mu Epsilon's motto was Zeamus Mura Emosa. The sorority's colors were violet or lavender and silver. Its flower was the lilac or the violet. Its jewels were the diamond and the pearl.

The sorority's badge was gold and set with pearls; it had an optional guard featuring the Greek letter of the member's chapter. Its coat of arms included non-heraldic emblems on a shield, with a motto below.

Zeta Mu Epsilon's magazine was The Evergreen.

== Activities ==
Zeta Mu Epsilon's members participated in various social events. They also participated in singing contests and inter-sorority basketball. At the College of Marshall, it sponsored the college's annual football dinner and held the annual Kollege Kapers variety show. The sorority's charitable activities included purchasing books for the campus library and creating a scholarship fund for students in need.

== Chapters ==
=== Collegiate chapters ===
Following are the known collegiate chapters of Zeta Mu Epsilon, with inactive chapters and institutions indicated in italics.

Chapter	Charter date and range	Institution	Location	Status	Ref.
Alpha	February 29, 1921 – 1938; active in 1949	Stephens College	Columbia, Missouri	Withdrew (ΖΜΑ)	(Note: Chapter withdrew and became Zeta Mu Alpha (local), which closed in 1954.)
Beta	1927–1931	Logan College	Russellville, Kentucky	Inactive	(Note: Chapter went inactive when the college closed.)
Gamma	1927–c. 1972	Greenbrier College	Lewisburg, West Virginia	Inactive	(Note: Originally called the Lewisburg Female Institute, the college closed in 1972.)
Delta	1927–1932	Belhaven College	Jackson, Mississippi	Inactive	
Epsilon	1928–1936	Greenville Woman's College	Greenville, South Carolina	Inactive	(Note: Chapter went inactive when the college was absorbed by Furman University in 1937.)
Zeta	October 20, 1929 – 193x ?	Millersburg College	Millersburg, Kentucky	Inactive	
Eta	February 21, 1931 – 1943	Blackstone College for Girls	Blackstone, Virginia	Inactive	(Note: Chapter formed from Alpha Sigma Chi (local), established in 1928.)
Lambda (First)	1931–after 1939	College of Marshall	Marshall, Texas	Inactive	(Note: Chapter formed at the College of Marshall, now East Texas Baptist University.)
Theta	October 13, 1939 – March 11, 1967	Rider University	Lawrence Township, New Jersey	Withdrew (ΔΖ)	(Note: Chapter formed from Omega Chi Phi (local), established in 1932. It became a chapter of Delta Zeta on March 11, 1967.)
Iota	1944–1961	Tennessee Wesleyan College	Athens, Tennessee	Withdrew (ΣΤΣ)	(Note: Chapter formed from Sigma Tau Sigma (local), established in 1931. In 1961, it withdrew and became a Delta Zeta colony)
Kappa	1948–1950	Potomac State College	Keyser, West Virginia	Inactive	
Mu	April 3, 1948 – 1959	Morris Harvey College	Charleston, West Virginia	Inactive	
Omega				Inactive	
Lambda (Second)	April 29, 1963 – 19xx ?	Trenton Junior College	Trenton, Missouri	Inactive	
		Berkeley Junior College Secretarial School	East Orange, New Jersey	Inactive	
Sigma	January 15, 1967 – 198x ?	Brandywine Junior College	Wilmington, Delaware	Inactive	(Note: Brandywine graduated its last class in 1991.)

=== Alumnae chapters ===
Following is an incomplete list of the alumnae chapters of Zeta Mu Epsilon.

Chapter	Charter date and range	Collegiate affiliation	Location	Status	Ref.
Kansas City Alumnae Chapter	1931 ?		Kansas City, Missouri	Inactive	
Charleston Alumnae Chapter	February 27, 1951	Morris Harvey College	Charleston, West Virginia	Inactive	
Knoxville Alumnae Chapter	April 1951	Tennessee Wesleyan College	Knoxville, Tennessee	Inactive	
Chattanooga Alumnae Chapter	195x ?		Chattanooga, Tennessee	Inactive	
Alpha Theta Alumnae Chapter	April 15, 1963	Rider University	Trenton, New Jersey	Inactive	
