= Phi Mu Sorority House (Urbana, Illinois) =

- U.S. National Register of Historic Places
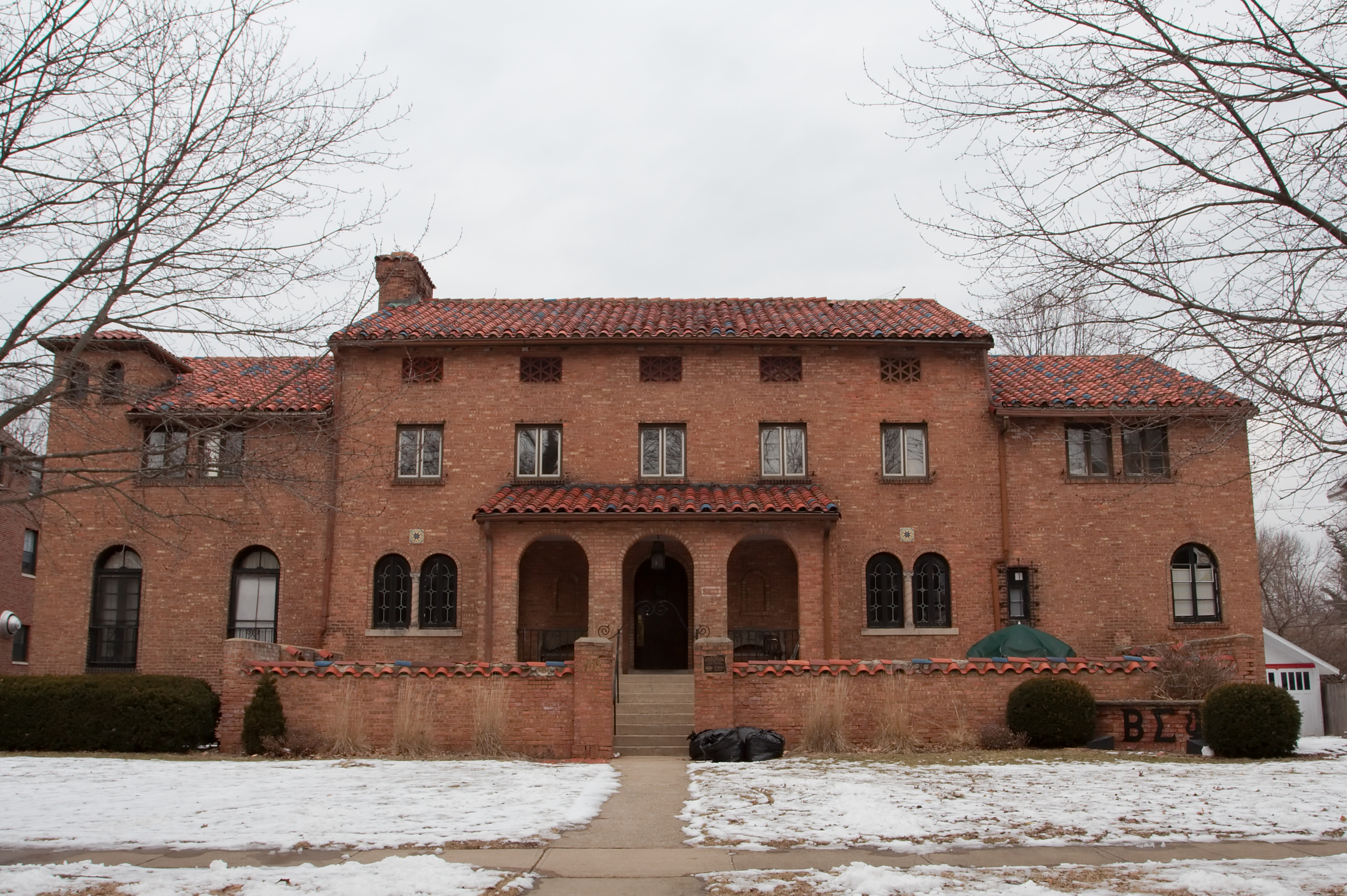

- Location within Illinois Location within the United States
- Location: 706 W. Ohio St., Urbana, Illinois
- Coordinates: 40°6′14″N 88°12′59″W
- Area: less than one acre
- Built: 1928
- Architectural style: Spanish eclectic
- MPS: Fraternity and Sorority Houses at the Urbana--Champaign Campus of the University of Illinois MPS
- NRHP reference No.: 90000751
- Added to NRHP: May 21, 1990

The Phi Mu Sorority House is a historic sorority house at the University of Illinois at Urbana–Champaign in Urbana, Illinois. The sorority house was designed and built by Crowl Construction in 1928 for the university's Delta Beta chapter of the Phi Mu sorority, which formed in 1921; the sorority itself was founded in 1852 and is one of the oldest sororities in the United States. At the time, the university had one of the largest Greek letter society movements in the country. The sorority's house has a Spanish Eclectic design with an arcaded porch and large patio, a campanile on one corner, and formerly, a colored tile roof.

Phi Mu used the house until 1941; through the war years, the building was used as women's student housing. In 1948, the newly chartered Alpha Gamma chapter of Phi Sigma Delta purchased the house, occupying it for the next twenty years until the fraternity merged into Zeta Beta Tau and the chapter closed. The Alpha chapter of Beta Sigma Psi purchased the house in 1969, and has occupied it continuously ever since.

The building was added to the National Register of Historic Places on May 21, 1990.
