= Gertrude Hoag Wilson =

American classical composer

Gertrude Hoag Spindle Wilson (March 1, 1888 – September 7, 1968) was an American composer and pianist, born in Christiansburg, Virginia. She studied music at Randolph Macon Woman's College and with Harry Rowe Shelley at the American Institute of Applied Music in New York City, where she earned a teacher's certificate. She married Alfred Randolph Wilson in 1910 and had four children, then married Paul Winfred Kear in 1960.

Wilson taught at the Blackstone Female Institute in Blackstone, Virginia, in 1906, then became the director of music at Asbury College in Wilmore, Kentucky, in 1909. She made several concert appearances as a solo pianist and as an accompanist. Her compositions were published by Harold Flammer, which was acquired by Shawnee Press, Inc., in 1970.

Wilson's compositions included:

== Chamber ==
- quartets
- 2, 3, and 4 part fugues for piano
- trios

== Vocal ==
- “Kisses”
- other songs
