= Blackstone College for Girls =

Private religious school in Blackstone, Virginia, USA

Coordinates: 37°04′26″N 78°00′40″W

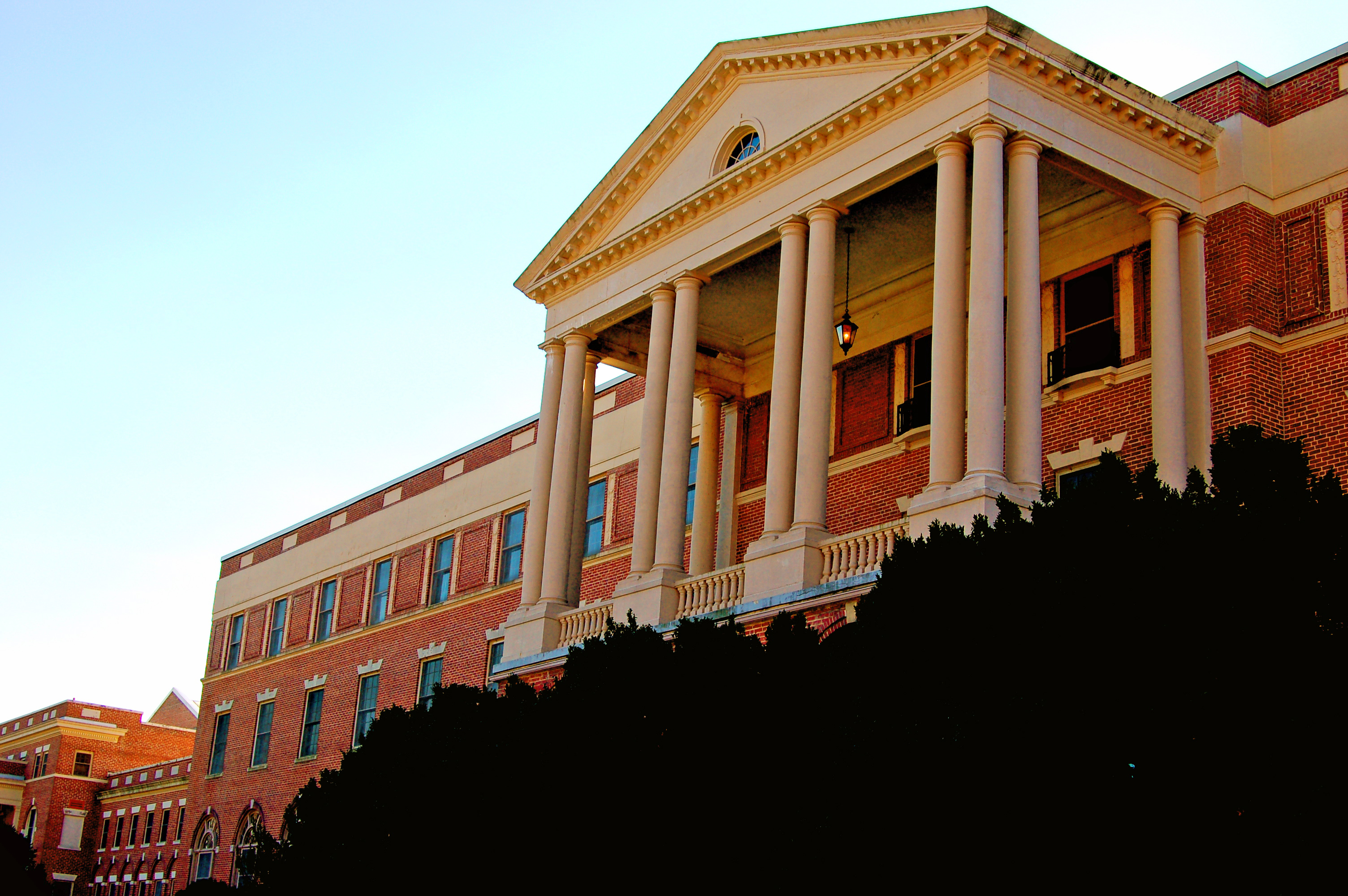
- Above, the former administration building of Blackstone College for Girls. The facility now serves as the Virginia United Methodist Assembly Center.
- Former name: Blackstone Female Institute
- Type: School for young women
- Active: February 15, 1892–1950
- Affiliations: Methodist Episcopal Church, South
- Location: Blackstone, Virginia, USA

Blackstone College for Girls was a private, religious school for young women in Blackstone, Nottoway County, in the U.S. state of Virginia. The school operated under the auspices of the Virginia Conference of the Methodist Episcopal Church, South between 1894 and 1950. The Virginia Department of Historic Resources acknowledged the significance of the site by erecting historical marker number K 174 in 1996. Blackstone College is also designated as a site on the Civil Rights in Education Heritage Trail. The school buildings still stand. Since 1955, the Virginia United Methodist Church has used the former school buildings as a conference center.

== History ==
The Blackstone Female Institute (BFI) received its charter from the Virginia state legislature on February 15, 1892. The institute's facilities were built on six acres of land donated by the Blackstone Land Company. BFI opened its doors to students in September 1894, and 71 students (29 boarders & 42 day students) enrolled for the first term. After the successful completion of the first academic year, Blackstone Female Institute was recognized by the Randolph-Macon System as a feeder school for Randolph-Macon Woman's College, which had been established in 1891 in Lynchburg. A college component was added to Blackstone Female Institute for the beginning of the 1915–1916 school year, and the name began to transition to Blackstone College for Girls (BCG), with the "college" name becoming firmly entrenched in the early 1920s. The 1916 & 1917 editions of the Cannon Ball, the campus yearbook, referred to the school as Blackstone College, and the 1918 Cannon Ball referred to it as Blackstone College for Girls.

In 1920 and 1922, two fires devastated the campus: the first one on May 7, 1920, destroyed the main building, and the second one on January 10, 1922, destroyed the Carnegie building that had been built in 1908–1909. The leaders of the college rebuilt the school on a smaller scale and reopened. In 1943, the college suspended operation for the duration of World War II, and the school buildings were used as apartments by servicemen and their families. Classes resumed in 1945, but dwindling enrollment and the Korean War forced the college to close in 1950.

The facility was then purchased by the Virginia Methodist Conference (now Virginia United Methodist Conference) and converted into a retreat and conference center, which was opened in 1955. On February 17, 2016, another major fire destroyed the facility's separate boiler plant building, which had been recently renovated. In March, it was announced that the center would cease operations on May 7, 2016, thus bringing to an end over sixty years of service. The physical facility was converted into The Inn at Blackstone, an inn and event venue, in 2022.

== Curriculum ==
At the school's inception, its students completed five years of study, the equivalent of the eighth grade plus the four years of high school. Modeled on the Randolph-Macon System of schools, the Blackstone curriculum provided three programs: a basic high school education, preparation for university study, and teacher training.

In addition to standard academic courses, the curriculum included three years of Bible studies. Bishop Cannon advocated not only intellectual, but spiritual training as well. Morning chapel, Sunday sermons, and personal counseling were all part of the school week.

== Faculty and administrators ==
James Cannon Jr., pastor and later bishop of the Farmville Methodist Episcopal Church, South, was the school's first principal, serving until early 1911. Thomas Rosser Reeves, pastor of Washington Street Church in Petersburg, Virginia, was BFI's principal from 1911 until 1914, when he resigned due to the death of his wife in 1912. James Cannon Jr., then returned to BFI as president, after spending several years laying the organizational foundations for what later became Lake Junaluska Conference & Retreat Center. Cannon was also a prominent leader in the temperance movement until he was accused of misusing church money after the 1928 election.

James Cannon Jr., was elected bishop in May 1918, and that summer's commencement was his last as president of Blackstone. W. Asbury Christian served as Blackstone's president from 1918 until 1924, when Horwood Prettyman Myers became the school's president. William Benjamin Gates took over the presidency of the college in 1926 after serving as dean and vice president of the school for two years, and he remained in that position until 1936, ushering in at least two sororities for the students: Sigma Iota Chi and Kappa Delta Phi. Gates left BCG and moved to Waynesboro, Virginia, where he purchased Fairfax Hall from the family of its founder, John Noble Maxwell, and oversaw its operation. Joseph Paul Glick then became Blackstone's president from 1936 until the college temporarily suspended operations after the 1942–1943 academic year due to World War II. Immediately after the war (two weeks after V-J Day), Blackstone College reopened for the 1945–1946 academic year with John Duncan Riddick as its president. President Riddick oversaw Blackstone's final commencement on June 5, 1950; he resigned later that month, and Everett Cox was appointed as acting president.

George P. Adams, a merchant from Blackstone, was a staff member at the school from its founding through its final semester. Adams oversaw the school's buildings and grounds and also served as the Secretary-Treasurer of the Board of Managers. The George P. Adams Memorial Scholarship Trust was established in his honor.

Composer Gertrude Hoag Wilson taught music at the school in 1906.

== Students and alumnae ==
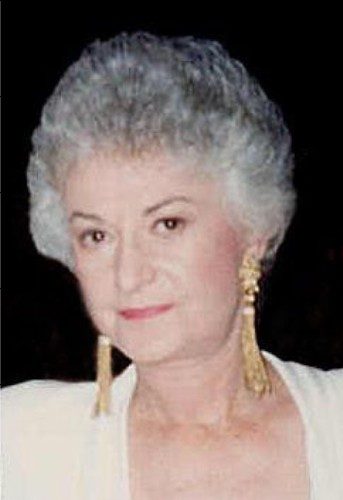
Bea Arthur

The first year the school operated, 29 boarders and 42 day students enrolled. At peak enrollment, shortly before the 1920 fire, the student body numbered approximately 500 pupils.

Notable alumna of Blackstone include actress Bea Arthur and Violeta Chamorro, former president of Nicaragua.
