= Phi Mu =

American collegiate sorority

- ΦΜ
- Founded: March 4, 1852; 174 years ago Wesleyan Female College
- Type: Social
- Affiliation: NPC
- Former affiliation: NJCP
- Status: Active
- Scope: National
- Motto: Les Soeurs Fideles "The Faithful Sisters"
- Member badge
- Colors: Rose and White
- Symbol: Quatrefoil
- Flower: Rose Color carnation
- Mascot: The Lion "Sir Fidel"
- Publication: The Aglaia
- Philanthropy: Children's Miracle Network
- Chapters: 136 active collegiate 150+ alumnae
- Members: 187,000+ lifetime
- Headquarters: 400 Westpark Drive; Peachtree City, Georgia 30269; United States
- Website: www.phimu.org

Phi Mu (ΦΜ) is an American college women's fraternity. The fraternity was founded at Wesleyan College in Macon, Georgia as the Philomathean Society in 1852. It's the second oldest female fraternal organization established in the United States.

Phi Mu has 136 active collegiate chapters and more than 187,000 initiated members. Phi Mu's national headquarters is in Peachtree City, Georgia. It is a member of the National Panhellenic Conference.

== History ==
Phi Mu was founded as The Philomathean Society literary society at Wesleyan College in Macon, Georgia on January 4, 1852; its formation was not publicly announced until March 4, 1852. Its founders were Mary Ann Dupont (Lines), Mary Elizabeth Myrick (Daniel), and Martha Bibb Hardaway (Redding). Philomathean is derived from the Greek philomath, which means a lover of learning. On June 24, 1904, the society was chartered as a national organization, Phi Mu, in the State of Georgia.

Phi Mu is referred to as a women's fraternity since some sororities predate the term "sorority" and are thus known as "fraternities for women." Phi Mu is one such sorority, and its formal name is Phi Mu Fraternity. Phi Mu is one of the two "Macon Magnolias," a term used to celebrate the bonds it shares with Alpha Delta Pi as sororities founded on that same campus.

A second chapter was established at Hollins College in 1904, followed by a chapter at Winston-Salem College, Sophie Newcomb College, and St. Mary's College in 1906. In 1907, chapters were chartered at Chevy Chase College, Hardin College, and Belmont College.

The sorority held its first national convention in 1907, with representatives of eight chapters in attendance. Phi Mu joined the National Panhellenic Conference on December 3, 1911. It was a member of the National Junior College Panhellenic.

In 1930, the sorority had 7,863 members and 57 active chapters and seven inactive chapters. It also had five statewide alumnae associations and thirty city-based alumnae chapters. In 1939, Alpha Delta Theta, a small national sorority founded at Transylvania University, merged with Phi Mu.

Phi Mu's national headquarters is in Peachtree City, Georgia. The Phi Mu Sorority House in Urbana, Illinois is on the National Register of Historic Places.

== Symbols ==
Although Phi Mu has no official jewel, the fraternity recognizes the official colors of rose, symbolizing womanhood, and white, symbolizing truth and purity. Its flower is the rose-colored carnation. Its symbol is a quatrefoil. Phi Mu's official mascot is a lion named Sir Fidel. Its magazine is The Aglaia, first published in 1907. Chi Omega also had an annual secret magazine The Philomathean from at least 1907 to 1913 and a secret quarterly called To Sakos from at least 1912 to 1913.

The sorority's badge depicts a black enamel quatrefoil shield, on top of a gold shield, bearing the Greek letters "ΦΜ", a hand holding a heart, and three stars. The new member pin is a small gold and black quatrefoil shield bearing the Greek letter "Φ".

Phi Mu's open motto is Les Soeurs Fideles or "The Faithful Sisters". The fraternity's creed is the uniting statement that every member of Phi Mu is expected to know and live her life by, defining what it means to be a noblewoman and enumerating several practices. The second-to-last line of the creed sums up the most important Phi Mu belief: "To practice day by day love, honor, truth."

== Philanthropy ==
Phi Mu's interest in philanthropy is expressed in the first line of its creed, "To lend to those less fortunate a helping hand". The sorority sponsored Children's Miracle Network Hospitals since 1986, raising more than $1.9 million for local children's hospitals. It also supports the National Women's History Museum, through an alliance created in July 2018. In 1999, Phi Mu established an annual National Philanthropy Day, held in October to support various charities.

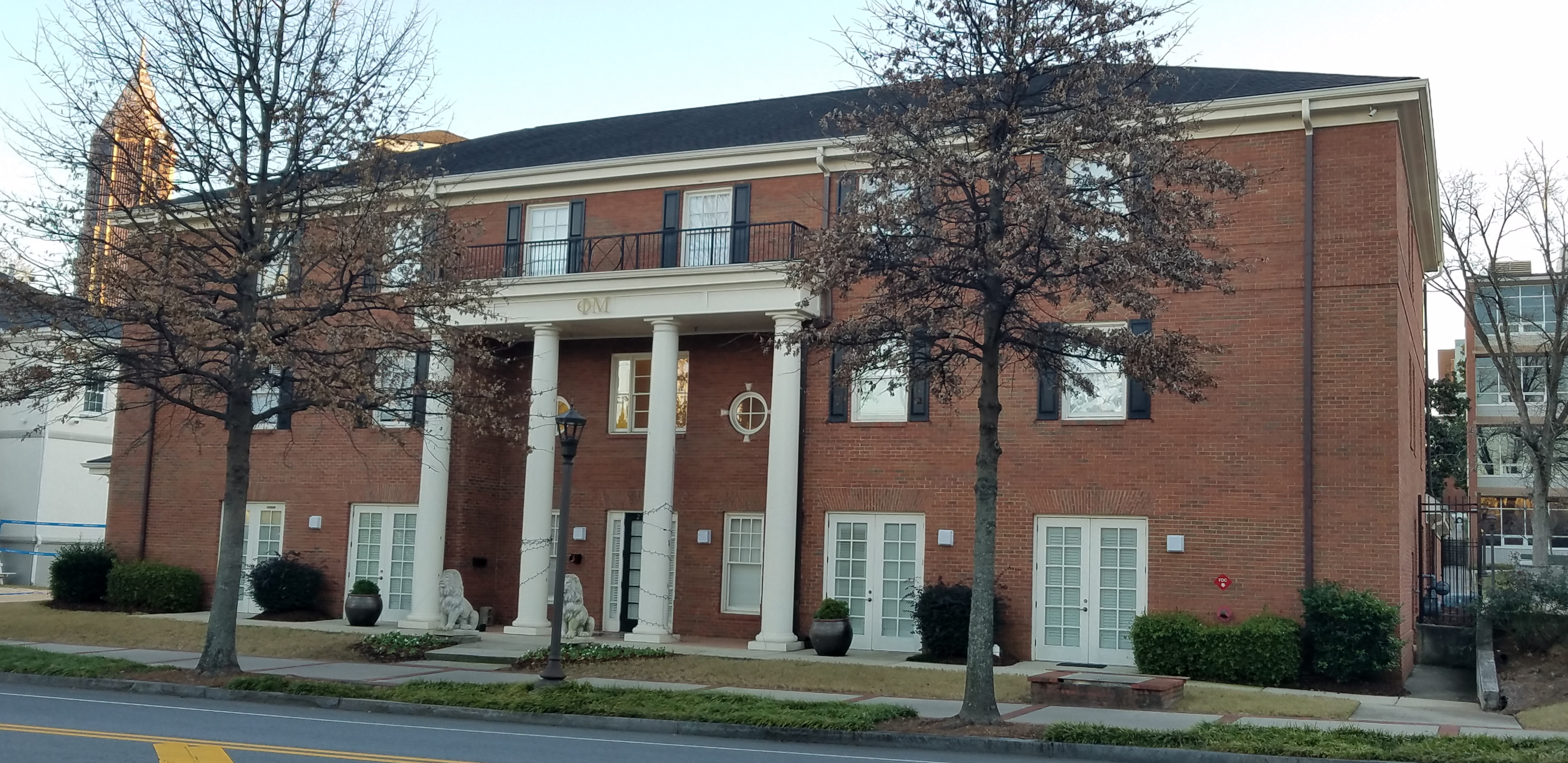
Phi Mu chapter house at Georgia Tech

== Chapters ==
Phi Mu has chartered more than 228 collegiate chapters, with 136 that are currently active. It has more than 150 alumnae chapters.

== Notable members ==
Phi Mu has initiated more than 187,000 members.

== Local chapter or member misconduct ==
In 2010, the Phi Mu chapter at the University of Texas at San Antonio was disciplined for hazing and humiliating pledges. Pledges were blindfolded, roped, and forced to a remote barn to recite the sorority's creed and imitate animals for the amusement of initiated members of the sorority.

In 2011, the sorority made national headlines after the chapter at the University of Southern Mississippi dressed in blackface for a "Cosby" themed party. The sorority members involved were placed on probation by Phi Mu's national headquarters and offered a public apology for their misconduct.

In 2013 and 2014, sorority women from multiple chapters at the University of Alabama – including Phi Mu, Chi Omega, Delta Delta Delta, Alpha Omicron Pi, Kappa Delta, Pi Beta Phi, and Alpha Gamma Delta, – alleged that either active members or some of their alumnae had prevented them from offering membership to black candidates because of their race. Phi Mu member Caroline Bechtel told Marie Claire that the chapter would automatically add any minority woman to a list of women to be dropped as a membership candidate. Bechtel and fellow students held a campus march to integrate Greek life on campus, and following media and national outcry, the university held a second round of recruitment in hopes of offering membership to more women, including black women. In the aftermath, Bechtel described hostility towards her from the sorority. Phi Mu offered membership to one black woman.

== See also ==
- List of social sororities and women's fraternities
