= Phi Sigma Nu (junior fraternity) =

American collegiate social fraternity

- ΦΣΝ
- Founded: February 14, 1927; 99 years ago Crane Junior College
- Type: Social
- Former affiliation: NJCP
- Status: Defunct
- Emphasis: Junior colleges
- Scope: National
- Colors: Gold and Emerald Green
- Flower: Yellow rose
- Chapters: 14
- Headquarters: United States

Phi Sigma Nu (ΦΣΝ) was an American junior college social fraternity. It was founded in 1927 at Crane Junior College in Chicago, Illinois. It established at least thirteen additional chapters across the United States before going defunct.

== History ==
Phi Sigma Nu originated at Crane Junior College in Chicago as the Bachelor's Club, an informal luncheon group, in February 1926. Desiring a more formal arrangement, the luncheon club became the Alpha chapter of Zeta Theta Nu fraternity on February 14, 1927. By February 1929, Zeta Theta Nu had established three chapters.

After learning that none of the existing four-year fraternities were interested in adding a chapter at a junior college, the Alpha chapter of Zeta Theta Nu reincorporated as a new national junior college fraternity, Phi Sigma Nu, in the State of Illinois on March 27, 1929. The fraternity was founded as a non-denominational Christian group.

A second chapter was chartered at Potomac State College on March 27, 1929. This was followed by chapters of Vincennes University, the College of Marshall, and Cumnock College in 1930. The fraternity was governed by a board that was elected at biennial national meetings. Its officers included president, vice president, secretary, and treasurer. The 1931 convention was held on July 5 in Chicago.

By 1938, Phi Sigma Nu had 220 members. It had fourteen chapters in 1939; many were at junior colleges and non-accredited institutions. Apparently impacted by World War II, the fraternity only had three active chapters and one alumni chapter in 1940. It was an associate member of the National Junior College Panhellenic by 1932, but was dropped from the NJCP in 1941.

Phi Sigma Nu was reorganized at a national convention in Cincinnati, Ohio on July 11, 1949. At the convention, the fraternity voted to move its national headquarters from the Nu chapter at Northeastern Oklahoma A&M College to Zeta chapter at Rider College. The national headquarters later moved to its Iota chapter at Bryant University until September 1957, when it moved to the Mu chapter at Woodbury College. Phi Sigma Nu had at least thirteen chapters as of 1963.

The fraternity lost several chapters to four-year fraternities, a change made possible as junior colleges became four-year institutions. Its last known active chapter was at Bryant University; it merged with Delta Kappa Epsilon in 1991.

== Symbols ==
Phi Sigma Nu's colors were gold and emerald green. Its flower was the yellow rose. The fraternity's song was "Hail to Our Phi Sigma Nu". Its periodical was the semiannual The Phi Sigma Nu.

== Chapters ==
Following are the known chapters of Phi Sigma Nu, with inactive chapters and institutions in italics.

| Chapter | Charter date and range | Institution | Location | Status | Ref. |
|---|---|---|---|---|---|
| Alpha | February 14, 1927 – 1933 | Crane Junior College | Chicago, Illinois | Inactive | (Note: The chapter formed from the Alpha chapter of Zeta Theta Nu, a three-chapter local fraternity. The chapter went defunct when the college temporarily closed during the Great Depression.) |
| Beta | March 27, 1929 – 197x ? | Potomac State College | Keyser, West Virginia | Inactive | (Note: Chapter formed from Kappa Kappa, established in 1922.) |
| Gamma | 1930–1931 | Vincennes University | Vincennes, Indiana | Inactive | |
| Delta | 1930–19xx ? | College of Marshall | Marshall, Texas | Inactive | (Note: The chapter formed from Phi Alpha, established in 1929 at the College of Marshall. The College of Marshall became the East Texas Baptist College in 1944.) |
| Epsilon | 1930–19xx ? | Cumnock College | Los Angeles, California | Inactive | (Note: Chapter formed from Delta Psi Omega, established in 1929.) |
| Zeta | 1931 – April 21, 1956 | Rider University | Lawrence Township, New Jersey | Withdrew (ΤΚΕ) | (Note: Chapter formed from Chi Pi Chi, established in 1926. It withdrew and became the Epsilon Zeta chapter of Tau Kappa Epsilon.) |
| Eta | 1931–19xx ? | Ferris State University | Big Rapids, Michigan | Withdrew (local) | (Note: Chapter formed from Gamma Phi Sigma 1920, reverted to Gamma Phi Sigma, and became a chapter of Sigma Phi Epsilon) |
| Theta | 1931–19xx ? | Beckley College | Harrisburg, Pennsylvania | Inactive | (Note: Chapter formed from Omega Phi Alpha, established in 1928.) |
| Iota | 1932 – January 26, 1991 | Bryant University | Smithfield, Rhode Island | Merged (ΔΚΕ) | (Note: Chapter became the Phi Sigma chapter of Delta Kappa Epsilon.) |
| Kappa | November 12, 1932 – 19xx ? | Wentworth Military Academy | Lexington, Missouri | Inactive | |
| Lambda | 1933–19xx ? | Nichols Junior College | Dudley, Massachusetts | Inactive | |
| Mu | 1933 – January 24, 1969 | Woodbury College | Burbank, California | Withdrew (ΔΣΦ) | (Note: Chapter formed from the Bachelors Club, established in 1933. It withdrew and became the Epsilon Pi chapter of Delta Sigma Phi.) |
| Nu | May 14, 1938 – 1943; 1946–1954 | Northeastern Oklahoma A&M College | Miami, Oklahoma | Inactive | (Note: Chapter formed from Iota Sigma Phi (local), established in 1929 at the Miami School of Mines, now Northeastern Oklahoma A&M College.) |
| | 1947–1959 | Tennessee Wesleyan College | Athens, Tennessee | Withdrew (ΦΣΚ) | (Note: Chapter formed from Phi Pi Delta (local), established in 1930. It withdrew and became the Omicron Tetarton chapter of Phi Sigma Kappa.) |

== Notable members ==
- George E. Bello (advisor), namesake of George E. Bello Center for Information and Technology at Bryant University

== Chapter and member misconduct ==
=== Delaware River crossing ===
On January 23, 1947, the Rider College chapter of Phi Sigma Nu required its pledges to recreate George Washington's crossing of the Delaware River as the final part of their initiation. The goal was to row across the Delaware River from Pennsylvania to New Jersey, and to walk to the Trenton Battle Monument in Trenton, New Jersey to capture a fraternity pennant. Dressed in Revolutionary War military costumes, forty fraternity pledges crossed the river in five rowboats, with George Chafey standing in the portrayal of George Washington. As the Phi Sigma Nu members reached the New Jersey shore after twelve minutes of rowing, a twin-seated airplane flew over the boats. On the shore were 100 members of Delta Sigma Phi, a rival fraternity, who began pelting the Phi Sigma Nu members with tomatoes, oranges, and firecrackers. Other attackers were in an amphibious truck. The pledges countered the attack with snowballs.

The pledges then followed Washington's route to the Bear Tavern, where members of Kappa Phi, another rival fraternity, launched a second attack. Kappa Phi attempted to kidnap General Washington (Chafey), but only managed to capture a Phi Sigma Nu member portraying a drummer boy. After refreshments at the tavern, the pledges moved on to the Trenton Battle Monument, where they were met by fifty Phi Sigma Nu members armed with pillows. However, the pledges endured the pillow fight and flying feathers, securing the pennant. The incident ended with the arrival of the New Jersey State Police.
