= National Junior College Panhellenic =

American umbrella group for sororities

- Founded: September 1914; 111 years ago United States
- Type: Umbrella
- Affiliation: Independent
- Status: Defunct
- Scope: National
- Headquarters: United States

The National Junior College Panhellenic (NJCP), also known as the National College Panhellenic of Junior College Sororities, was an umbrella association for American junior college sororities. NJCP was established in 1914.

== History ==
The National Junior College Panhellenic (NJCP) was established in September 1914 as an association for national junior college sororities. Its main purpose was to help the individual sororities, provide mutual assistance, and to improve the "sorority situation on the junior college campus". Its founding members included Beta Sigma Omicron, Eta Upsilon Gamma, Phi Mu, Phi Mu Gamma, and Sigma Iota Chi. Zeta Mu Epsilon joined on March 26, 1927.

NJCP's founding officers included Erna Berry Watson (Beta Sigma Omega), chairman; Mrs. George M. Null (Eta Upsilon Gamma), secretary; and Agnes Duffey (Sigma Iota Chi). Later, NJCP was managed by a board consisting of a chairman, secretary and treasurer, college panhellenic committee chair, panhellenic publicity, special conditions chair, survey of scholarship standards chair, and eligibility of national standards chair.

By 1929, its membership had changed as several sororities withdrew their membership due to the closure of colleges or the lack of required qualifications. Some loss was caused by chapters affiliating with sororities at four-year universities. Phi Mu and Beta Sigma Omicron became four-year sororities. Phi Mu Gamma became a professional sorority for drama.

The National Junior College Panhellenic changed its name to the National College Panhellenic of Junior College Sororities in 1929. Its members in 1929 were Kappa Delta Phi, Eta Upsilon Gamma, Theta Tau Epsilon, Zeta Mu Epsilon, and Sigma Iota Chi.

In 1932, Phi Sigma Nu junior fraternity had joined the NJCP as an associate member. NJCP held a four-day national conference in Kansas City, Missouri, in August 1935. At that time, it represented both junior college fraternities and sororities. In 1939, NJCP provided statistical information to Hardin Junior College in support of applications to establish chapters of Phi Theta Kappa, Sigma Iota Chi, and Zeta Mu Epsilon at the college. NJCP consisted of five national sororities in 1939. Helen F. Holt was the NJCP executive chairman for 1939 and 1940. Its 1941 convention was held in November in Chicago, Illinois.

== Member institutions ==
Following are the former member institutions of the National Junior College Panhellenic. Inactive sorority's are indicated in italics.

Organization	Greek letters	Founding date	NJCP dates	References
Beta Sigma Omicron	ΒΣΟ	December 12, 1888	September 1914 – c. 1930	(Note: Founding member of the National Junior College Panhellenic.) (Note: After shifting to four-year institutions, Beta Sigma Omicron became an associate member of the National Panhellenic Conference in 1930 and a full member in 1933. The sorority went defunct in 1964.)
Eta Upsilon Gamma	ΗΥΓ	November 1901	September 1914	
Kappa Delta Phi	ΚΔΦ	February 19, 1921	192x ?	
Phi Mu	ΦΜ	March 4, 1852	September 1914 – 191x ?	(Note: The sorority became a four-year sorority by withdrawing the charters of its junior college chapters. It joined the National Panhellenic Conference in 1911, apparently having a membership in both umbrella organizations at the same time.)
Phi Mu Gamma	ΦΜΓ	October 17, 1898	September 1914 – c. 1921	(Note: In 1921, the sorority reorganized as a professional sorority for drama.)
Phi Sigma Nu	ΦΣΝ	February 1927	Before 1932–1941	(Note: This was junior fraternity.)
Sigma Iota Chi	ΣΙΧ	December 15, 1903	September 1914	
Theta Tau Epsilon	ΘΤΕ	February 1, 1921	192x ?–193x ?	(Note: The sorority went defunct in 1938.)
Zeta Mu Epsilon	ΖΜΕ	February 29, 1921	March 26, 1927	

== See also ==
- List of Greek letter umbrella organizations
