= Harry Rowe Shelley =

American composer, organist (church and concert), and professor of music

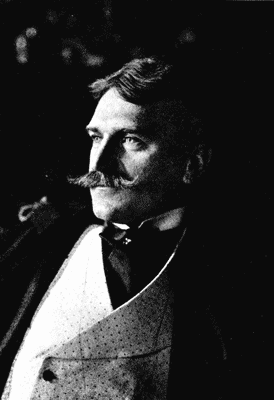
Portrait of Harry Rowe Shelley

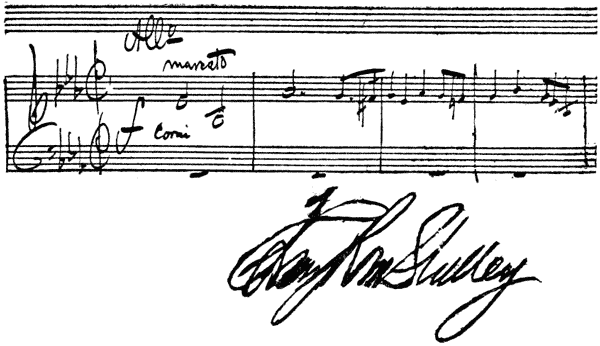
Autograph of Shelley

Harry Rowe Shelley (June 8, 1858 – September 12, 1947) was an American composer, organist (church and concert), and professor of music. Born in New Haven, Connecticut, Shelley studied with Gustave J. Stoeckel at Yale College, Dudley Buck, Max (Wilhelm Carl) Vogrich, and Antonín Dvořák in New York, and completed his musical education in London and Paris. According to his New York Times obituary, Shelley "penned church music that won him wide popularity. For 60 years a host of English-speaking peoples throughout the world sang his hymns."

Shelley attended Hopkins Grammar School in New Haven, Connecticut, and at fourteen played the organ at Center Church on the Green in New Haven. Although he entered Yale, he did not complete his freshman year. Shelley was organist at the Church of the Pilgrims during the ministry of Henry Ward Beecher and played at his funeral. Shelley died at age 89 in Short Beach, Connecticut.

Shelley taught at the American Institute of Applied Music, where his students included composers Mabel Madison Watson and Gertrude Hoag Wilson, among others.

== Positions held ==
- 1878–1881 – Organist, Church of the Pilgrims, Brooklyn
- 1881–1887 – Organist, Plymouth Church (same)
- 1887–1899 – Organist, Church of the Pilgrims
- 1899–1914 – Organist, Fifth Avenue Baptist Church, New York City, which later became Park Avenue Baptist and eventually Riverside Church
- 1915–1936 – Organist, Central Congregational Church, Brooklyn
- Faculty member, American Institute of Applied Music

== Selected compositions ==
Among his works are two symphonies; a symphonic poem: The Crusaders; a suite for orchestra: Souvenir de Baden-Baden; sacred cantatas: Vexilla Regis (1893);The Inheritance Divine (1895); Death and Life (1898); a violin concerto; an opera: Leila (manuscript); anthems: "The King of Love My Shepherd Is" (1886); "Hark!, Hark, My Soul" (1887); an arrangement for Harriet Beecher Stowe's poem "Still, Still with Thee" (1930); and other songs and organ pieces. He also composed the Santa Claus Overture; and Lochinvar's Ride (1915).

== Honors ==
- 1898 – Elected to membership in the National Institute of Arts and Letters

== Contemporary recordings ==
- Shelley, Harry Rowe. "Santa Claus Overture, a lyrical intermezzo", on Those Fabulous Americans, The Symphony Orchestra of America; Matthew B. Phillips, conductor. Albany Records (Troy 103), 1993. Compact disc.
