= Logan College =

Methodist college in Russellville, Kentucky (1856–1931)

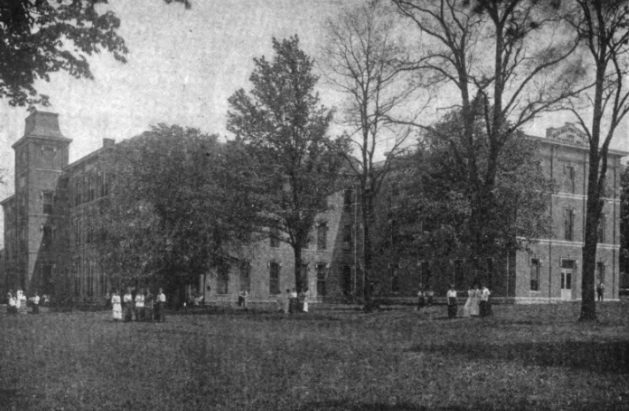
- Logan College, c. 1919
- Former names: Russellville Academy; Russellville Collegiate Institute; Logan Female College; Logan College and Conservatory; Logan Female Junior College
- Type: Private women's college
- Active: 1856–May 1931
- Religious affiliation: Methodist
- Location: Russellville, Kentucky, United States

Logan College, also known as Russellville Collegiate Institute, Logan Female College, Logan College and Conservatory, and Logan Female Junior College, was a private women's college in Russellville, Kentucky. It was owned and operated by the Louisville Conference of the Methodist Episcopal Church, South. Operating with different names from 1856 to 1931, the school started as a finishing school, became a four-year college, and finally became a junior college.

== History ==
In 1856, members of the pastorate of Rev. James E. Carnes formed a stock company to purchase the Russellville Academy. The academy had operated for several years in an old Masonic building on the corner of Seventh and Summer Streets in Russellville, Kentucky. Carnes was the president of the school from 1856 to 1858. Rev. Edward Stevenson followed Carnes as the school's principal. Under Stevenson's leadership, the Louisville Conference of the Methodist Episcopal Church, South purchased the school's property and added a brick dormitory for girls.

The academy was rechartered as the Russellville Collegiate Institute in 1860, giving it the authority to grant college diplomas. Stevenson served as its president until his death on June 6, 1864. David Morton became its president from 1865 to 1868. Morton wrote a charter that was passed by the Kentucky legislature in 1867, changing the collegiate institute's name to Logan Female College. Morton continued his involvement with the college for 28 years, first as president, then as agent and director. Morton raised $5,000 for a new three-story brick building on the corner of Seventh and Summer Streets.

In 1874, Logan Female College had 100 students in its college and primary departments. Between 1889 and 1900, its enrollment reached a high of 150 students. Logan College and Conservatory was a four-year college until 1916. It was known as Logan College, a junior college, from 1917 to 1931.

In February 1930, an effort was made to merge Logan College with Kentucky Wesleyan College, vacating the Russellville campus. However, that effort failed to gain approval at a meeting of the Louisville Conference on March 13, 1930. The college closed in May 1931 at the end of the academic year. More than 10,000 women and girls had attended Logan College.

The Russellville School Board purchased the property and incorporated it into the town school system.

== Campus ==
Logan College's main building was a three-story brick structure with stone trim, located on the corner of Seventh and Summer Streets in Russellville, Kentucky. It also included a dormitory, with bathrooms featuring hot and cold water. Its dining room had a capacity of 150. Lander Hall, another three-story brick structure, was added in 1912; it included an auditorium, stage, gymnasium, music rooms, and art rooms. In 1920, a gymnasium and swimming pool were added. The campus also included tennis courts, basketball courts, and a croquet green.

The campus was located at the intersection of the O. & N. Railroad and Louisville and Nashville Railroad.

== Academics ==
The school included college and primary departments. Originally, the school taught music and the fine arts. As Logan College, it granted B.A. and B.S. degrees. Its curriculum included the sciences, art, expression, physical training, and music (voice, piano, and violin), along with stenography, bookkeeping, and typing. After 1916, it was a junior college that awarded Associate in Arts diplomas.

== Student life ==
Students at Logan College attended the Methodist Church in Russellville. Logan College included chapters of Eta Upsilon Gamma, Sigma Iota Chi, Zeta Mu Epsilon sororities. The college had a Glee Club; the club's performance was broadcast over radio station WFIW in March 1930. Another club was the Logan Players, a theater group.

== See also ==
- List of women's universities and colleges in the United States
