= Allie May "A.M." Carpenter =

American painter (1887–1978)

- Born: January 4, 1887; Prairie Home, Missouri
- Died: July 1978; Denver, Colorado

Allie May "A.M." Carpenter (January 4, 1887 – July 1978) was an artist and art educator. She worked in a wide variety of media, including oils, pastels, watercolor, printmaking, design, etching, china painting, interior design and decoration, and tapestry. Many of her works are signed "A. M. Carpenter".

== Education ==
She was a graduate of Hardin College and Conservatory of Music in Mexico, Missouri, a Baptist college established in 1873 for young women. She was a 1918 graduate in art of the Art Institute of Chicago. She studied under D. C. Smith, C. A. Harbert, Blanche Van Court Snider, and Emma Richardson Cherry.

== Career ==
Carpenter's first faculty position was at Mansfield College (now Louisiana College) in Pineville, Louisiana, in 1919. She moved to Abilene, Texas, where she became the head of the Department of Art at Simmons University in 1922. She traveled extensively and lived in the Philippines for a year, and worked on sabbatical in New York City in 1923 and Los Angeles from 1929 to 1930. She retired from Hardin-Simmons in 1961.

Her works are reported to be in the First Baptist Church of Abilene; in Lamar, Travis, and Abilene, Texas, high schools; and at Mansfield College in Louisiana. She exhibited in Fort Worth and Austin, Texas, and Memphis, Tennessee, including the Texas Federation of Women's Clubs in 1931, and the Annual Exhibition by Texas Artists at the Fort Worth Art Museum in 1935. She was a member of the Texas Fine Arts Association, the American Artist Professional League, the College Art Association, and the Western Artists Association.
