= William W. Bennett (educator) =

American preacher and author (1821–1887)

William Wallace Bennett
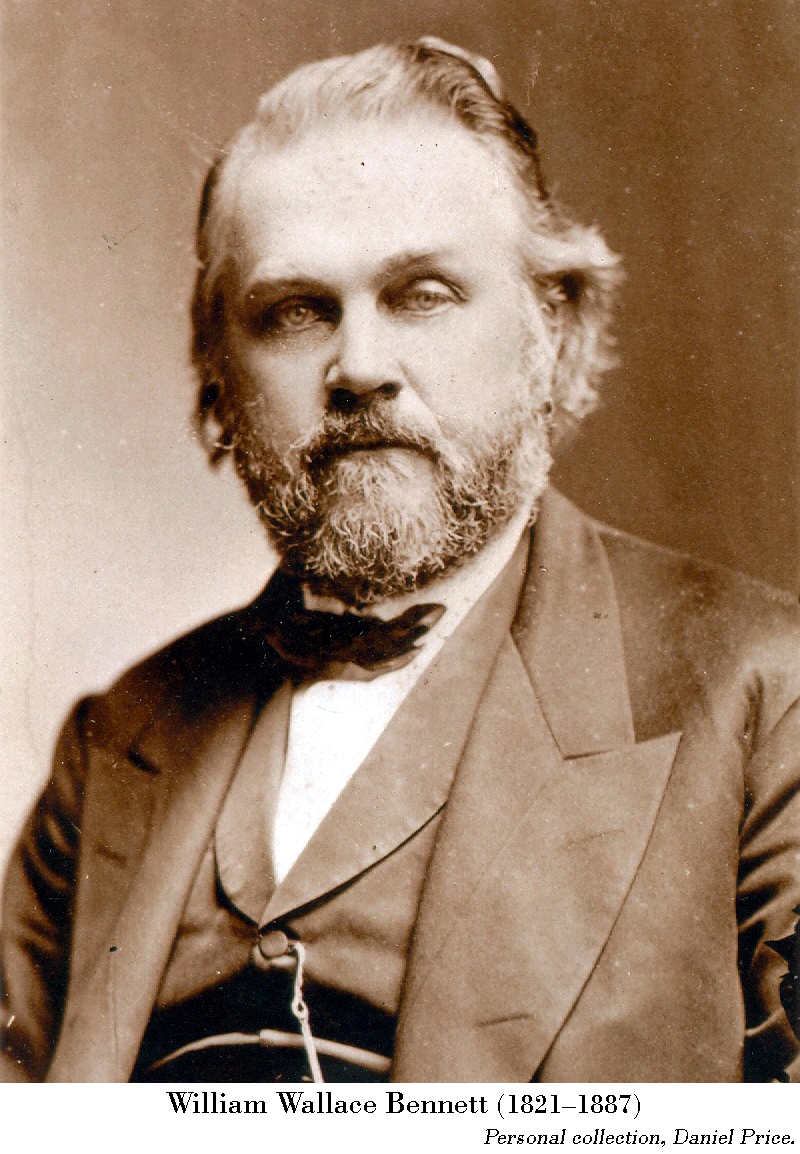
- William Wallace Bennett (1821-1887)

6th President of Randolph-Macon College
- In office 1877–1886
- Preceded by: James A. Duncan
- Succeeded by: William Waugh Smith

Personal details
- Born: February 24, 1821 Richmond, Virginia, US
- Died: June 7, 1887 (aged 66) Louisa County, Virginia, US
- Resting place: Hollywood Cemetery, Richmond, Virginia
- Spouse: Virginia Lee Sangster
- Education: University of Virginia
- Occupation: Minister, College President

William Wallace Bennett (1821–1887) was an American Methodist preacher, editor, author and administrator. He served as a Confederate Chaplain during the American Civil War and President of Randolph–Macon College.

== Biography ==
=== Early life ===
William Wallace Bennett, son of Eli and Mary C. Bennett, was born at Richmond, Virginia, on February 24, 1821. He was raised as a Methodist, and "made a profession of religion" to Reverend Gervas M. Keesee in 1839 at Portsmouth, Virginia. Bennett married Virginia Lee Sangster (1830-1909) in 1855.

"A schoolmate says of him: "He was studious, with great grasp of intellect and steadiness of purpose,"" wrote biographer Boggs. "The writer, and others, perhaps, will remember his modest reference to his fondness for reading while a boy, in using "the first money he could command" to subscribe for the Richmond Advocate, which he subsequently edited with so much ability."

=== Career ===
He served as an itinerant Methodist preacher in rural Virginia from 1842 to 1847 and in Charlottesville, Virginia, from 1848 to 1849. Enabled by proximity during the late 1840s, he attended classes at the University of Virginia and graduated in 1850. 1852 appointment as Chaplain to the school was short-lived, due to ill health; he soon returned to preaching along Virginia circuits.

During the American Civil War (1861–65), he served as a Chaplain with the Confederate States Army. In March 1862 he was appointed Superintendent of the Soldier's Tract Association by the Virginia Annual Conference of the Methodist Episcopal Church, South. "By midsummer it had put in circulation nearly 800,000 pages of tracts, and had ten efficient colporters in the field. Its operations steadily increased to the close of the war; and besides the dissemination of millions of pages of excellent religious reading, with thousands of Bibles and Testaments, two semi-monthly papers were issued, The Soldier's Paper, at Richmond, and The Army and Navy Herald, at Macon, Georgia, 40,000 copies of which were circulated every month throughout the armies." In the winter of 1865, he was sailed past a Charleston, South Carolina blockade. Bennett, at London, England when hostilities concluded, was in the midst of collecting Bibles and religious tracts donated to the Southern Army.

Randolph–Macon College conferred an honorary Doctor of Divinity degree on Bennett in 1867. From 1867 to 1877, he edited the Richmond Christian Advocate at Richmond, Virginia for the Virginia Annual Conference. Bennett was a published author. Memorials of Methodism in Virginia, from its Introduction into the State, in the Year 1772, to the Year 1829 first appeared in 1870. His 1877 Narrative of the Great Revival Which Prevailed in the Southern Armies During the Late Civil War Between The States of the Federal Union resulted from his experience as a Confederate chaplain. The book has been digitalized by Tufts University. A History of Methodism for Young People was published in 1878. Bennett self-published The Great Red Dragon: An Appeal to Plain People on the Evils and Dangers of the Liquor Traffic in 1885.

Trustees elected him President of Randolph–Macon at Ashland, Virginia. He served from 1877 to 1886. He retired due to failing health and died in Woodbourne, Louisa County, Virginia, on June 7, 1887. He was interred at Hollywood Cemetery.

Bennett represented the Virginia Conference at the General Conference of the Methodist Episcopal Church, South from 1858 until retirement from ministry. In 1881 he represented the denomination in an Ecumenical Methodist Conference at London.

== Bibliography ==
- Memorials of Methodism in Virginia (1870)
- Narrative of the Great Revival (1877)
- A History of Methodism for Our Young People (1878)
- The Great Red Dragon (1885)

== Legacy ==
Sangster Papers (MS294) at Alexandria Library retain correspondence.

Academic offices
Preceded by James A. Duncan	President of Randolph-Macon College; 1877–1886	Succeeded by William Waugh Smith
