= Beta Sigma Omicron =

American collegiate sorority (1888–1964)

- ΒΣΟ
- Founded: December 12, 1888; 137 years ago University of Missouri
- Type: Social
- Former affiliation: NPC; NJCP
- Status: Merged
- Merge date: August 7, 1964
- Successor: Zeta Tau Alpha
- Scope: National (US)
- Motto: "We Live to Do Good"
- Colors: Ruby and Pink
- Symbol: Stars, Covenant, Lamp, Laurel
- Flower: Red and Pink Carnations
- Jewel: Ruby
- Patron Greek deity: Hestia
- Publication: The Beta Sigma Omicron (open); The Lamp (esoteric), and The Urn
- Chapters: 61
- Members: 15,000 lifetime
- Headquarters: United States

Beta Sigma Omicron (ΒΣΟ) was an American college sorority. It was founded in 1888 at the University of Missouri in Columbia, Missouri. The sorority established 61 chapters before merging with Zeta Tau Alpha in 1964. It was a founding member of the National Junior College Panhellenic.

== History ==
Beta Sigma Omicron was founded at the University of Missouri in Columbia, Missouri on December 12, 1888. Its founders were Maude Haines, Eulalie Hockaday, and Katherine Turner.

By 1909, the sorority had ten active chapters and their alumnae associations. The ten chapters were at Belmont College, Brenau College, Centenary College, Central Female College, Fairmont Seminary, Hardin College, Liberty Ladies' College, Stephens College, Synodical College, and Transylvania College. The sorority held its first convention in June 1910 in Louisville, Kentucky.

The early expansion went primarily to women's schools in the southern states, a fraction of which were coordinated with larger male-only schools (Tulane, Missouri, etc.). However, a significant number of early chapters were at schools that ceased operation before or during the Great Depression. One chapter had even been placed in a high school.

Because of the prevalence of chapters at two-year schools and other non-accredited institutions, Beta Sigma Omicron operated independently of the National Panhellenic Conference for its first forty years of existence. As an independent sorority, Beta Sigma Omicron was at risk of chapters being "poached" by other national sororities. In 1909, Beta Sigma Omicron had 117 active members and 373 total initiates from seven chapters. In 1914, it was a founding member of the National Junior College Panhellenic.

In 1913 and 1917, two of the sorority's chapters, at Brenau College and at Hollins University, respectively, withdrew from the sorority. The Brenau group was absorbed by that school's chapter of Delta Delta Delta in 1915, and in 1919 the Hollins group became a chapter of Chi Omega. Still, growth persisted. In 1925, with 7 of the first 24 chapters being inactive, the sorority changed its expansion policy so that it only expanded to only Class "A" universities.

In 1932, the sorority absorbed three of the four chapters of Pi Sigma Gamma, a small sorority that disbanded that year. Beta Sigma Omicron became an associate member of the National Panhellenic Conference in 1930 and a full member in 1933.

At Beta Sigma Omicron's 1963 Convention (75th anniversary), a vote on absorption or disbanding was taken. Although Beta Sigma Omicron had chartered 61 chapters and had almost 15,000 initiated sisters, at the time of the anniversary, it only had thirteen active chapters and no longer met the National Panhellenic Conference's membership requirements. The vote was unanimous for absorption, and Beta Sigma Omicron looked for an organization to merge with. On August 7, 1964, Beta Sigma Omicron was absorbed by Zeta Tau Alpha.

Of the thirteen active chapters, seven were absorbed into Zeta Tau Alpha: Samford University (at the time, Howard College), Millsaps College, William Jewell College, the University of Evansville, Thiel College, Westminster College, and Youngstown College. Three others were released to join Alpha Phi, as Zeta Tau Alpha already had chapters on their campuses: Louisiana State University, Baldwin Wallace University, and Indiana University of Pennsylvania. Three small chapters at urban schools in New York and Ohio chose to become local sororities but failed soon thereafter.

A recent 1961 chapter, which would have added a fourteenth active chapter to the merger negotiations, had been placed at Waynesburg University. However, this group withdrew in 1963, the year before the merger, to form a local due to the National Sorority being unwilling to accept the Negro student that the chapter had pledged. That group survived and became a chapter of Phi Sigma Sigma nine years after its withdrawal.

== Symbols ==
The Beta Sigma Omicron badge was a monogram of the Greek letters "ΒΣΟ", with the Omicron around the Beta and the Sigma superimposed on the Omicron. Its pledge pin was a red enamel triangle, with a gold star in each corner and a Grecian lamp in the center. The sorority's insignia consisted of stars, covenant, lamp, and laurel.

The sorority's colors were ruby and pink. Its flag included three horizontal bars, with the outside both being pink and the center being red; the top bar has the sorority's name in red and the bottom bar has three red stars. Its banner was triangular, with a pink center and a broad red border, with the founding date of 1888 in red in the center and the sorority's Greek letters in pink in the corners.

Its flowers were red and pink carnations or Richmond and Killarney Roses. Its jewel was the ruby. Its patron goddess was Hestia. Its motto was "We Live to do Good".

The sorority's publications were The Beta Sigma Omicron, first published in 1905, The Lamp (esoteric), and The Urn

== Chapters ==
Beta Sigma Omicron established 61 chapters before merging with Zeta Tau Alpha in 1964.

== See also ==
- List of social sororities and women's fraternities
