= Fulton Female Synodical College =

Women's college in Fulton, Missouri, US

Fulton Female Synodical College, or just Synodical College, was a four-year college in Fulton, Missouri, providing education for young women from 1873 until 1928. The school operated under the auspices of the Presbyterian Church. Synodical College was recognized by the University of Missouri as a standard junior college after 1916. Synodical College closed in 1928, when the church decided to support a new four-year institution.

== History ==
Fulton Female Synodical College was a four-year college for women in Fulton, Missouri, from 1873 until 1928. The school operated under the auspices of the Presbyterian Church. The Synod, meeting in 1871 at Cape Girardeau, Missouri, accepted an offer that year of $16,500 in cash subscriptions from the citizens of Callaway County and 4 acres (16,000 m^{2}) of land, donated by Daniel M. Tucker. The college opened in 1873.

Synodical was a successor institution to the Fulton Female Academy, which had been opened by Rev. William W. Robertson in 1842 as one of the earliest American women's colleges. It became affiliated with the Presbyterian Church in 1871.

Synodical College was recognized by the University of Missouri as a standard junior college after 1916. In 1925, the Synod of Missouri approved a resolution, at a meeting in St. Joseph, Missouri, to enhance the curriculum to provide a four-year collegiate program. The initial steps toward the goal included an affiliation agreement with Westminster College to share some faculty and courses. Synodical College closed in 1928.

== Student activities ==
The Academy, and later the College, were home to several early sorority chapterchapters of sororities what became four-year college sororities: Delta Gamma (1882-1885), Beta Sigma Omicron (1891-1928), and Alpha Kappa Psi (1913-1916), along with several two-year societies: Eta Upsilon Gamma (1918-1921), Theta Tau Epsilon (1923-1928), Phi Theta Kappa (1925-1928), and Sigma Iota Chi (1925-1928). Four of these were still active when the school closed in 1928.

== Notable people ==
=== Trustees ===
The first board of trustees included:

- William King, Edwin Curd
- W.W. Robertson
- C.C. Hersman
- John F. Cowan
- W.W. Trimble
- T.B. Nisbet
- Samuel T. Shaw
- Samuel I. McKamey

The trustees during the final 1927–28 academic year included:

- C.F. Richmond
- John E. Kerr
- T.P. Harrison
- C.R. Nisbet
- S.G. Wood
- T.R.R. Ely
- C.A. McPheeters
- J.W. Gallaher
- J.W. McKamey
- E.J. Grant
- J.G. McConkey
- I Cochran Hunt
- R.S. Boyd and Joseph Rennie.

=== Presidents ===
- T.O. Rogers, 1873–1874
- W.W. Hill, 1874–1877
- B.H. Charles, 1877–1888
- H.C. Evans, 1888–1893
- John W. Primrose, 1893–1896
- Thomas Peyton Walton (previously president of Elizabeth Aull Seminary at Lexington, Missouri)
- John James, 1914-1924
- Colin A. McPheeters served as Acting President during the final 1927–28 academic year

=== Alumnae ===
- Hallie Paxson Winsborough (1865–1940), American church worker

== See also ==
- List of current and historical women's universities and colleges
- Timeline of women's colleges in the United States
