= Mississippi Synodical College =

- U.S. National Register of Historic Places
- Location: 220 College Avenue, Holly Springs, Mississippi, U.S.
- Built: 1903
- NRHP reference No.: 83000960
- Added to NRHP: April 20, 1983

The Mississippi Synodical College is a historic building in Holly Springs, Mississippi, USA. Formerly a religious college, it is home to the Marshall County Historical Society and Museum. It was listed on the National Register of Historic Places since 1983.

== History ==
The building was built to house the Mississippi Synodical College in 1903. The building is located at 220 College Avenue in Holly Springs, a small town in Northern Mississippi.

Mississippi Synodical College had its basis in a 19th-century women's college. It became the Mississippi Synodical College in 1903, after the Presbyterian synodical lines were updated and the college fell under the control of the Mississippi Synod. It was a two-year women's college with a preparatory lower school. Eventually, enrollment grew beyond the capacity of the college's two antebellum houses. The college relocated the old Hull Place and undertook construction of an administration building, a two-story auditorium, and a connecting hallway between the classroom and the original Watson House.

Mississippi Synodical College became the first two-year college in Mississippi to receive state accreditation in 1916. Its students enjoyed typical campus activities, including chapters of Sigma Iota Chi and Theta Tau Epsilon sororities. The college increased its enrollment and expanded onto newly purchased property in the 1920s, adding dormitories and a headmaster's house. Other additions included a tennis court and a gymnasium with a swimming pool.

However, enrollment dropped during the Great Depression. The college was merged with Belhaven College in 1939. Its remaining students were moved to the Belhave campus in Jackson, Mississippi. Watson House and Hull Place were razed around 1940, making way for the Old North Mississippi Hospital in 1941. Meanwhile, a Classical Revival building on the east side was razed. An hospital-associated nursing school used the college's administrative building, dormitories, and gymnasium. When the hospital and nursing school closed in 1970, the college's form administrative building became the Marshall County Historical Museum.

As a contributing property to the East Holly Springs Historic District, former Mississippi Synodical College administrative building has been listed on the National Register of Historic Places since April 20, 1983. It is also a Mississippi Landmark.

== Architecture ==
Mississippi Synodical College was designed as a three-story, hip-roofed building made with red bricks.
