= Pi Sigma Gamma =

Defunct American collegiate sorority

- ΠΣΓ
- Founded: November 23, 1919; 106 years ago University of California, Berkeley
- Type: Social
- Former affiliation: NPC
- Status: Merged
- Merge date: 1932
- Successor: Beta Sigma Omicron
- Scope: National
- Colors: White, Royal blue, Golden yellow, and Rose
- Symbol: Three books, lamp, and crossed swords
- Publication: Triple Wing
- Chapters: 4
- Members: 439 lifetime
- Headquarters: United States

Pi Sigma Gamma (ΠΣΓ) was an American collegiate social sorority. It was established in 1919 at the University of California, Berkeley and merged with Beta Sigma Omicron in 1932. It was a member of the National Panhellenic Conference.

== History ==
Pi Sigma Gamma was founded on November 23, 1919, by two University of California, Berkeley students, Alice H. Cassidy and Kathleen D. Coghlan. It established four chapters before its demise at the start of the Great Depression. National conventions were held throughout the 1920s.

The UCLA chapter closed in 1930. The remaining three chapters affiliated with Beta Sigma Omicron (ΒΣΟ) in 1932. With the merger, Beta Sigma Omicron gained a chapter (Alpha Omega) at Washington and a chapter at Hunter (Beta Alpha), while California merged with the Alpha Iota chapter of the Beta Sigma Omicron chapter on that campus.

Pi Sigma Gamma was a member of the National Panhellenic Conference. Its total membership was 439.

== Symbols ==
The colors of Pi Sigma Gamma were white, royal blue, golden yellow, and rose. Its symbols were three books, a lamp, and crossed swords. The sorority had several publications: a songbook, a Pledge Manual, and a Handbook for Pledges. Its magazine was Triple Wing.

The sorority's coat-of-arms was described as "A group of emblems within a shield outline, three books, lamp, and crossed swords are employed in the device."

== Chapters ==
Following are the chapters of Pi Sigma Gamma.

Chapter	Charter date and range	Institution	Location	Status	Ref.
Alpha	November 23, 1919 – 1932	University of California, Berkeley	Berkeley, California	Merged (ΒΣΟ)	(Note: Merged with the "Alpha Iota chapter" of Beta Sigma Omicron with the national merger of the two sororities.)
Beta	1921–1932	University of Washington	Seattle, Washington	Merged (ΒΣΟ)	(Note: Became the "Alpha Omega chapter" of Beta Sigma Omicron with the national merger of the two sororities.)
Gamma	1926–1932	Hunter College	New York City, New York	Merged (ΒΣΟ)	(Note: Became the "Beta Alpha chapter" of Beta Sigma Omicron with the national merger of the two sororities.)
Delta	1928–1930	University of California, Los Angeles	Los Angeles California	Inactive	

== See also ==
- List of social sororities and women's fraternities
