= Hardin College and Conservatory of Music =

Women's college in Mexico, Missouri, US

Coordinates: 39°09′53″N 91°52′55″W

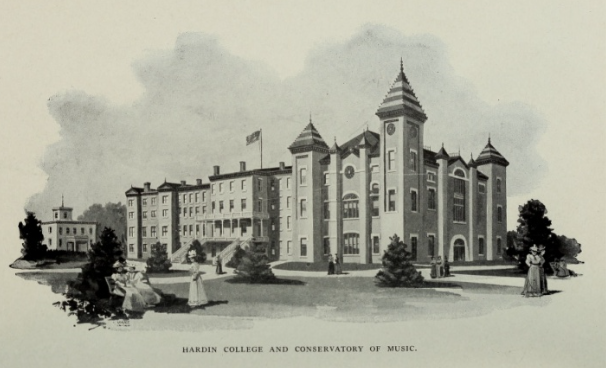
- Type: Private
- Active: 1873–June 1932
- Founder: Charles Henry Hardin
- Religious affiliation: Baptist
- Location: Mexico, Missouri, United States
- Campus: Urban
- Language: English
- Colors: Black and Gold

Hardin College and Conservatory of Music was a women's college located in Mexico, Missouri. It opened in 1873 and closed in 1932 due to financial pressures caused by the Great Depression. Harden was the home of the Alpha chapter of Phi Theta Kappa, the international honor society for two-year colleges

== History ==
Charles Henry Hardin, Missouri senator and later Governor of Missouri, founded Hardin College and Conservatory of Music in Mexico, Missouri in 1873. Hardin served as president the college' board of trustees and contributed land and an endowment. Classes began in the fall of 1873, including preparatory and collection tracks. Ninety girls enrolled in the initial class.

The college's president was Priscilla Baird from 1879 through 1885. John W. Million became president in 1900, with the previous presidents being A. W. Terrill and A. K. Yancy. In 1901, Hardin College was recognized as the first junior college in the state and affiliated with the Baptist Church. It had students from Missouri and California, Illinois, the Indian Territory (Oklahoma), Kansas, and Texas.

In 1910, the college and high school had a combined enrollment of 229 girls. It maintained an enrollment of around two hundred. In 1918, the junior college division had 18 literary graduates, seven vocational graduates, and nine fine arts graduates.

At the start of the Great Depression, Hardin College had debts of $300,000 ($5,625,000 in 2024 money) and not able to recover. It went into receivership in January 15, 1932 and continued to operate under court order. Rev. Blake Smith, who became the college's president in February 1931, resigned on January 29, 1932. The savings and loan that held the college's mortgage foreclosed in April 1932. Later that month, the faculty of the college collectively sued for $26,000 of backpay. The college closed in June 1932 after completion of the semester on May 25, 1932, and did not reopen in the fall of 1932. The campus was sold at a courthouse auction on December 4, 1933.

The Missouri Military Academy leased the former campus from June 1, 1933 to June 30, 1934, with plans to start a junior college. The campus was used by the unrelated Hardin Junior College, starting in 1942.

== Campus ==
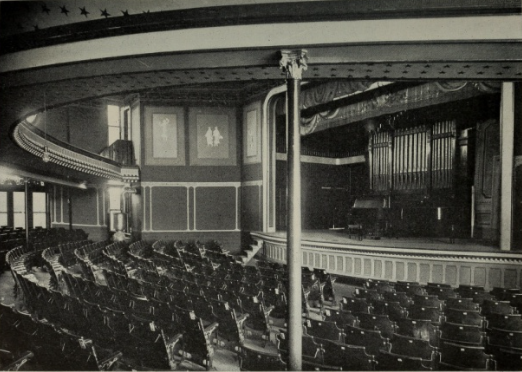
Hardin College and Conservatory of Music auditorium, c. 1908

Charles Henry Hardin donated ten acres for the college campus in the south side of Mexico, Missouri. This property included the former Christian Seminary building, built in 1858. The college's main building, Hardin Hall, was added in 1874; this three-story brick building with stone trim included an auditorium, classrooms, dormitory rooms, and an exterior that featured turrets. Hardin oversaw the design and construction of the campus. The campus also included ample grounds.

In 1915, a gymnasium and swimming pool were added, including a basketball venue and the music department's studios and practice rooms. In 1923, a two-story brick dormitory called Richardson Hall was added. In 1925, the college campus was valued at $600,000 ($11,015,180 in 2024 money). Founded through a donation by Theodore Presser, Presser Hall was added to house the Conservatory of Music in 1924; this brick building is four stories high and includes an auditorium with 1,200 seats, 28 practice studios, and seven large studios.

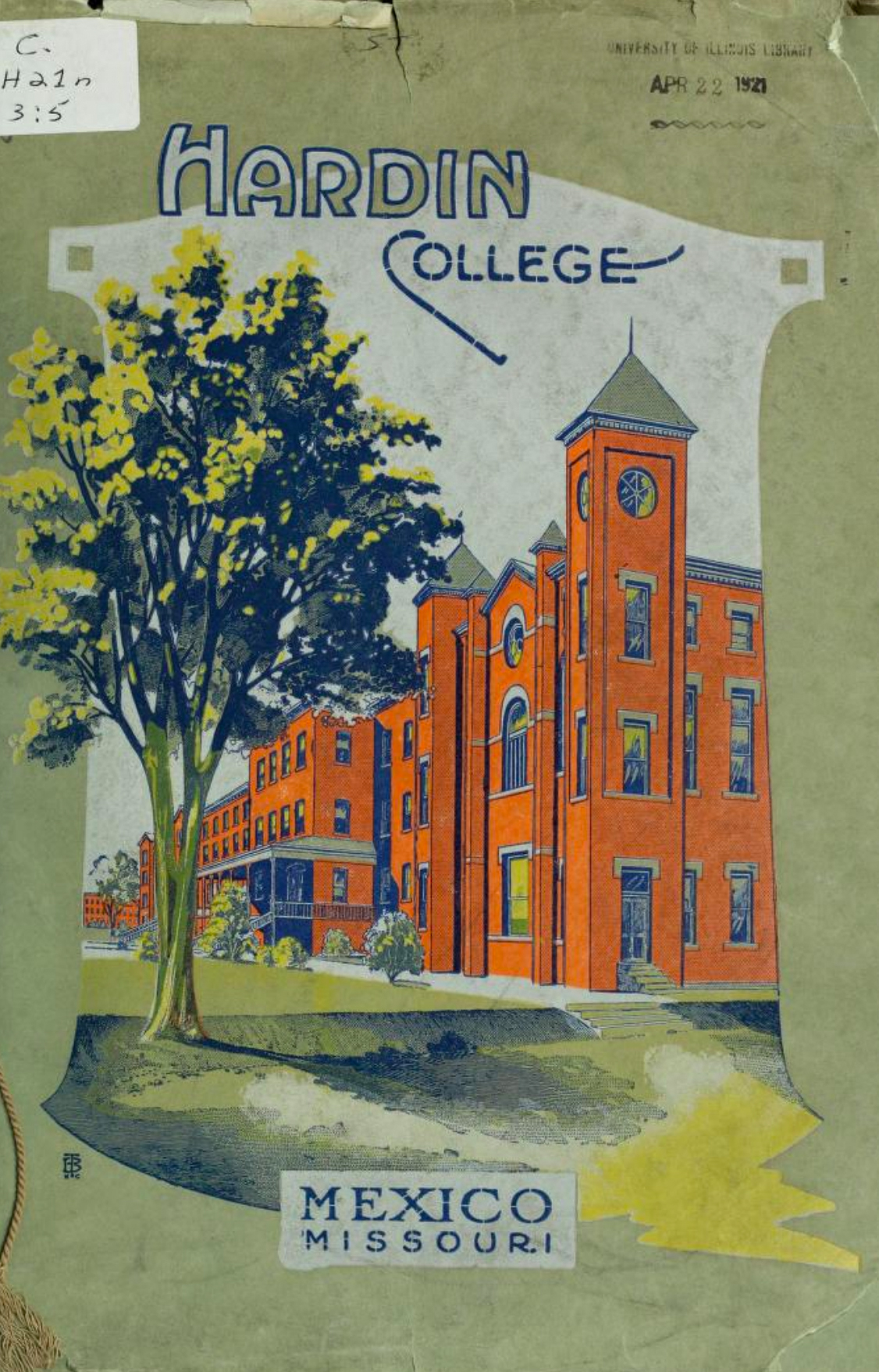
Hardin College Newsletter, 1919

Hardin Hall was razed in 1939. Richardson Hall and the gymnasium passed to the Mexico school district. After serving as a city-owned venue for sports and music, a deteriorating Presser Hall was purchased by a private foundation in 1989. After renovation, Presser Arts Center opened in 2017.

== Academics ==
Hardin College had a reputation for being strong academically and was called the "Vassar of the West". Two academic courses were offered: the preparatory, consisting of basic primary studies, and the collegiate, covering advanced classes. Hardin College was recognized as a junior college in 1901. The college had three fields of study: literary, fine arts, and vocational. Literary included history, language, literature, mathematics, and science. Fine arts included art, expression, and physical culture, along with the Conservatory of Music. The vocational course included business, education, and home economics.

In 1918, Hardin College was one of the founding schools of Phi Theta Kappa, the international honor society for two-year colleges and was designated as the Alpha chapter.

== Student life ==
Hardin College had five social sororities, including a chapter of Sigma Iota Chi sorority from 1914 to 1931; a chapter of Phi Mu from1907 to 1911; and a chapter of Eta Upsilon Gamma, established in 1902. Its Pierian and Delphian literary societies participated in oratory and debate, forming a campus team that attended the Missouri Junior College Debating Association. It had a campus chapter of the YWCA and drama club, glee club, orchestra, riding club, and skating club. There were also civics, French, and Spanish clubs. Students participated in social events with students from the nearby Missouri Military Academy.

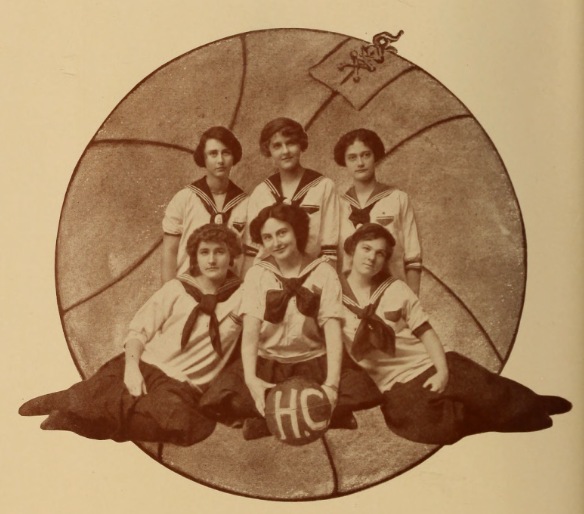
Hardin College basketball team

== Athletics ==
Hardin College's colors were black and gold. Its athletic association sponsored basketball, field hockey, intramural swimming, soccer, tennis, and volleyball. Its basketball team competed with local high schools and colleges, beginning in 1916. Later, there was a Missouri women's junior college league, competing in basketball, tennis, and track. Hardin player Dorothy Holmes won the initial state tennis singles title. Hardin College also won the state basketball championship, with an undefeated record in 1919. However, after most Missouri colleges dropped women's basketball, Hardin discontinued its program in 1926.

== Notable people ==
=== Alumnae ===
- Allie May "A.M." Carpenter, painter
- Roberta Lawson, Native American activist and clubwoman

=== Faculty ===
- Priscilla Baird, president of the college before leaving to establish Baird College
- Agnes Fay Morgan, taught chemistry at the college, later chair of the home economics program at the University of California
- Louise Pettibone Smith, taught English and Latin at the college before becoming a professor in the Department of Biblical History at Wellesley College
- M. Louise Thomas, taught at the college for six years before founding Lenox Hall in St. Louis
- William M. Treloar, taught music at the college before becoming a member of the U.S. House of Representatives
- Victor C. Vaughan, taught Latin and chemistry at the college, later the dean of the University of Michigan Medical School from 1891 to 1921

== See also ==
- List of current and historical women's universities and colleges
- List of defunct colleges and universities in Missouri
