= Sigma Iota Chi =

American collegiate sorority (1903-c. 1989)

- ΣΙΧ
- Founded: December 15, 1903; 122 years ago St. James & St. Xavier Academy
- Type: Social
- Former affiliation: NJCP
- Status: Defunct
- Defunct date: c. 1989
- Emphasis: 2-year colleges
- Scope: National
- Motto: Deus, Libertas, Lex
- Colors: Purple and Gold
- Symbol: Skull and crossbones, scroll
- Flower: Violet
- Jewel: Amethyst
- Mascot: Eagle
- Publication: The Parchment
- Chapters: 70
- Headquarters: United States

Sigma Iota Chi (ΣΙΧ) was a national junior college sorority in the United States. Sigma Iota Chi was established as a literary sorority in 1903 and installed at least 70 chapters in secondary schools and colleges. It was a founding member of the National Junior College Panhellenic. The sorority's last chapter closed in the 1980s.

== History ==
Sigma Iota Chi literary sorority was founded on December 15, 1903, at the St. James & St. Xavier Academy in Alexandria, Louisiana. Its founders were faculty members Greer Duncan and Kathryn Hardtner, along with honor students from the academy and graduates of the two colleges that merged to create the academy. Duncan created the framework for the sorority.

Many of the sorority's early chapters were established at other secondary schools or pre-college boarding schools. In 1914, it had nine chapters and two alumnae associations, with 400 total initiates. Four years later, in 1918, it had eleven active chapters, five alumnae associations, and 800 initiates.

By 1921, Sigma Iota Chi became a junior college sorority and dropped its pre-college chapters. It had 100 active members at six chapters, with a total of 1,200 initiates and five alumnae associations in 1921. The sorority was governed by a Grand Chapter, elected at an annual convention.

In 1929, Sigma Iota Chi was the largest junior sorority in the United States, with 23 chapters. It was a founding member of the National Junior College Panhellenic.

As many of its host institutions became four-year colleges, some chapters of Sigma Iota Chi withdrew to join larger National Panhellenic Conference sororities. Sigma Iota Chi had several active chapters in the 1970s, with at least one continuing until 1989.

== Symbols ==
Sigma Iota Chi's motto was Deus, Libertas, Lex. Its insignia or coat of arms featured a shield with a raised arm and a star, with an eagle above and the motto on a scroll below.

The sorority's badge was a gold shield with a skull and crossbones in black enamel and a white scroll that bore the Greek letters ΣΙΧ. Its pledge pin was a purple shield bearing the Greek letters ΣΙΧ in gold.

The sorority's colors were purple and gold. Its flower was the Violet and its jewel was the amethyst. Its magazine was The Parchment, first published in 1907.

== Chapters ==
Sigma Iota Chi chartered at least 70 chapters.

== See also ==
- College fraternities and sororities
- List of social sororities and women's fraternities
