= Phi Mu Gamma (professional) =

American professional oratory sorority

- ΦΜΓ
- Phi Mu Gamma member's badge
- Founded: February 1921; 105 years ago Emerson College of Oratory
- Type: Professional
- Affiliation: Independent
- Status: Defunct
- Emphasis: Allied arts
- Scope: National
- Pledge pin
- Colors: Gold, Black and Blue
- Flower: Sweet-heart rose and Forget-me-not
- Publication: Tri Shield
- Chapters: 16
- Headquarters: United States

Phi Mu Gamma (ΦΜΓ) was an American collegiate professional sorority for the arts. It was established at the Emerson College of Oratory (now Emerson College) in Boston, Massachusetts in 1921. It merged with Lambda Phi Delta, a professional fine arts fraternity, in 1930. It went inactive in the latter 1960s or early 1970s.

== History ==
In January 1931, predecessor group Phi Mu Gamma a junior college sorority, went inactive. Its Iota chapter at Emerson College of Oratory (now Emerson College) in Boston, Massachusetts reestablished the organization as a "national honorary oratory sorority" in February 1931.

Its purpose was to organize female students who were interested in drama and to perform acts of charity. The sorority's founding members were Kathryn Capron, Frances Collins, Natalie Curry, Miriam Kempton Evans, Ardis Hackman, Dorothy Richards, and Jesse Southwick. Potential members were required to demonstrate scholarship and talent in drama.

On February 28, 1921, the dramatic club at the University of Oklahoma petitioned to became a chapter of Phi Mu Gamma. It became Beta chapter on April 26, 1921. A third chapter was chartered at Drake University in April 1922. By 1929, the sorority had six chapters. In 1930, it was known as a national professional dramatic fraternity.

The fraternity was governed by national grand officers, elected at national conventions. In February 1927, its national convention was held in Des Moines, Iowa.

In June 1930, representatives of Phi Mu Gamma met in Omaha, Nebraska, with Lambda Phi Delta, a national fine arts sorority, to discuss a merger. Lambda Phi Delta's chapters were located in the Midwest and had not been established on any of Phi Mu Gamma's campuses. Because Phi Mu Gamma was the older of the two organizations, it was decided to use its name. The merger became official on October 10, 1930. Both sororities also agreed to use October 17, 1890, the founding date of the predecessor social sorority, for the merged sorority's Founder's Day. After the merger, Phi Mu Gamma had sixteen chapters.

In 1940, the sorority called itself a national allied arts fraternity. It was active until the late 1960s or early 1970s, when its chapters closed without apparent successor.

== Symbols and traditions ==
Initially, Phi Mu Gamma used the badge of its predecessor sorority. Its badge was a stacked shield, with the largest in gold and surrounded in pearls and turquoise, topped by a black enamel shield and, then, a gold shield with the Greek letters ΦΜΓ in black enamel. After the merger with Lambda Phi Delta, a new badge was designed that combined the shield with the Lambda Phi Delta triangular badge. Its pledge pin was a black, enameled triangle superimposed by a plain gold shield.

The sorority's colors were gold, black, and blue. Its flowers were the sweet-heart roses and forget-me-nots. Its quarterly publication was the Tri Shield.

The sorority's national calendar included:

- October 17 – Founders' Day
- November 15 – Fiske Benefit Day
- March 15 – Community Arts Day
- May 14 – Fiske Award Day

== Philanthropy ==
Each chapter performed a play at least once a year to raise funds for charitable activities. For example, the chapter at Emerson College raised funds for a scholarship to be awarded to a junior non-member of the sorority.

In 1931, Phi Mu Gamma considered establishing a foundation in memory of Minnie Maddern Fiske. This concept was accepted as a national program at the 1932 convention and was unanimously accepted at the 1936 convention. This led to a central loan fund, available to worthy students pursuing one of the professional arts. It also included various awards, including a national fellowship award, a national council Fiske scholar awards, state scholarship awards, active chapter awards, and alumnae chapter awards.

== Chapters ==
Following is a list of the chapters of Phi Mu Gamma, with inactive institutions indicated in italics.

Chapters	Charter date and range	Institution	Location	Status	Ref.
Alpha	February 1921–after 1969	Emerson College of Oratory (now Emerson College)	Boston, Massachusetts	Inactive	
Beta (First) (later Iota)	April 26, 1921 – 1938	University of Oklahoma	Norman, Oklahoma	Inactive	
Gamma	April 1922	Drake University	Des Moines, Iowa	Inactive	(Note: Chapter formed from the Masquers dramatic club.)
Delta	1925–1939	Simpson College	Indianola, Iowa	Inactive	
Epsilon	1926	Northwestern College of Speech Arts	Minneapolis, Minnesota	Inactive	
Zeta (First)	June 1926	University of Washington	Seattle, Washington	Inactive	(Note: Chapter formed from the Marionettes, established in 1925.)
Eta				Inactive	
Theta (First)				Inactive	
Iota				Inactive	
	February 1927	University of Louisville	Louisville, Kentucky	Inactive	(Note: Chapter formed from Gamma Gamma Gamma (local).)
Kappa	1928	New River State College	Montgomery, West Virginia	Inactive	(Note: The college was in Montgomery at the time; its successor school, West Virginia Tech, moved to Beckley, West Virginia, in 2015.)
Lambda	1926 ?	Minneapolis College of Music and Arts	Minneapolis, Minnesota	Inactive	
Beta (Second)	October 10, 1930	Northwestern University School of Speech	Evanston, Illinois	Inactive	(Note: Was originally a chapter of Lambda Phi Delta, which merged on October 10, 1930.)
Delta (Second)	October 10, 1930	Kansas State Teachers College of Pittsburg	Pittsburg, Kansas	Inactive	
Zeta (Second)	October 10, 1930	Kansas City–Horner Conservatory of Music	Kansas City, Missouri	Inactive	(Note: In 1959, the Kansas CIty–Horner Conservatory merged with University of Kansas City, now called the University of Missouri–Kansas City.)
Theta (Second)	October 10, 1930 – 1936	Lombard College	Galesburg, Illinois	Inactive	(Note: The college closed after graduation in 1930, and, therefore, this chapter may not have participated in the merger, but the chapter letter was assigned.)
Mu	October 10, 1930 – 1939	Kansas State Teachers' College	Emporia, Kansas	Inactive	
Nu	October 10, 1930– c. 1932	James Millikin University	Decatur, Illinois	Inactive	(Note: Phi Mu Gamma was only in the college's yearbook for 1932.)
Xi	October 10, 1930	Chicago Musical College	Chicago, Illinois	Inactive	
Omicron	October 10, 1930	Kansas City–Horner Conservatory of Music	Kansas City, Kansas	Inactive	
Pi	March 27, 1930	Sallie Sharp School of Expression	Wilmington, Delaware	Inactive	
Rho				Inactive	
Sigma	1939	American Conservatory of Music	Chicago, Illinois	Inactive	
Sigma	1939	The Chicago Conservatory College	Chicago, Illinois	Inactive	
Sigma	1939	Goodman Theatre	Chicago, Illinois	Inactive	
Sigma	1939	School of the Art Institute of Chicago	Chicago, Illinois	Inactive	
Sigma	1939	Sherwood Community Music School at Columbia College Chicago	Chicago, Illinois	Inactive	
Tau	1939	Depaul University	Chicago, Illinois	Inactive	
Upsilon	1940	Indiana State Teachers College		Inactive	
Phi				Inactive	
Chi				Inactive	
Psi	1914–1938	Wisconsin Conservatory of Music	Milwaukee, Wisconsin	Inactive	
Omega	1940	University of Paris	Paris, France	Inactive	
Alpha Omega	1916	National Professional Field		Inactive	
	19xx ?	College Misericordia	Dallas, Pennsylvania	Inactive	
	19xx ?	Wolcott Conservatory of Music	Denver, Colorado	Inactive	
	19xx ?	MacPhail College of Music and Dramatic Art	Minneapolis, Minnesota	Inactive	

== Alumni chapters ==
Alumni chapters include Beta Xi in Chicago.

== Notable members ==
Some of the notable members and honorary members of Phi Mu Gamma include:

- Nellie Cornish, artist
- Angna Enters (honorary), dancer, mime, and artist
- Lynn Fontane (honorary), actress
- Rudolf Ganz (honorary), pianist, conductor, composer, and teacher
- Lillian Gish, actress
- Maurice Goldblatt, co-founder of the Goldblatt's department store
- Helen Hayes, actress
- Jascha Heifetz (honorary), violinist
- Eve LeGalliene, actress and author
- Fritz Leiber, author of fantasy, science fiction, and horror
- Alfred Lunt (honorary), actor
- Julia Marlowe, actress
- Conrad Nagle (Gamma, honorary), actor
- Ruth St. Denis, modern dancer
- Carl Sandburg, writer and editor
- Otis Skinner, stage actor
- E. H. Sothern, actor
- Lawrence Tibbett (honorary), opera singer
- Frank Lloyd Wright, architect

== See also ==
- Professional fraternities and sororities
