= List of Sigma Alpha Iota chapters =

Sigma Alpha Iota is an international honorary music fraternity. It was founded on June 12, 1903, at the School of Music of the University of Michigan as an honorary music sorority.

== Collegiate chapters ==
In the following list, active chapters are indicated in bold and inactive chapters and institutions are in italics.

| Chapter | Charter date and range | Institution | Location | Status | Ref. |
|---|---|---|---|---|---|
| **Alpha** | June 12, 1903 | University of Michigan | Ann Arbor, Michigan | Active | |
| **Beta** | December 3, 1904 | Northwestern University | Evanston, Illinois | Active | |
| Gamma | 1906–19xx ? | American Conservatory of Music | Chicago, Illinois | Inactive | (Note: The conservatory closed in 1991.) |
| Delta | 1907–1967 | Detroit Conservatory of Music | Detroit, Michigan | Inactive | |
| Epsilon | June 4, 1909–xxxx ? | Ithaca College | Ithaca, New York | Inactive | |
| **Zeta** | November 27, 1911 | Jordan Conservatory, Butler University | Indianapolis, Indiana | Active | |
| Eta (see **Eta-Iota**) | January 24, 1914 – 1955 | Cincinnati Conservatory of Music | Cincinnati, Ohio | Consolidated | (Note: Eta and Iota consolidated in 1955 to form Eta-Iota chapter when the Cincinnati Conservatory of Music and the College of Music of Cincinnati merged to form the Cincinnati College-Conservatory of Music, which is now part of the University of Cincinnati.) |
| **Theta** | November 14, 1914 | Washburn University | Topeka, Kansas | Active | |
| Iota (see **Eta-Iota**) | February 10, 1915 – 1955 | College of Music of Cincinnati | Cincinnati, Ohio | Consolidated | |
| **Kappa** | March 17, 1915 | University of Nebraska–Lincoln | Lincoln, Nebraska | Active | |
| Lambda | June 19, 1915 – xxxx ? | New England Conservatory of Music | Boston, Massachusetts | Inactive | (Note: Originated as the Eta (second) chapter of Phi Mu Gamma in 1908.) |
| Mu | November 26, 1916 – xxxx ? | University of North Dakota | Grand Forks, North Dakota | Inactive | |
| **Nu** | May 15, 1917 | Millikin University | Decatur, Illinois | Active | |
| **Xi** | May 17, 1917 | Lawrence University | Appleton, Wisconsin | Active | |
| Omicron | March 26, 1920 – xxxx ? | North Dakota State University | Fargo, North Dakota | Inactive | |
| **Pi** | May 29, 1920 | Drake University | Des Moines, Iowa | Active | |
| **Rho** | April 12, 1921 | University of Wisconsin–Madison | Madison, Wisconsin | Active | |
| Sigma (First) | 1921–1946 | Kansas City–Horner Conservatory of Music | Kansas City, Kansas | Inactive, Reassigned | (Note: In 1926, the Horner Institute of Fine Arts merged with the Kansas City Conservatory of Music. The Kansas City–Horner Conservatory of Music merged with University of Kansas City in 1959.) |
| Tau (see Tau-Sigma) | April 28, 1922 – 1959 | Kansas City–Horner Conservatory of Music | Kansas City, Missouri | Consolidated | (Note: Tau and Iota Sigma consolidated to form Sigma-Tau in 1959.) |
| Upsilon | 1923–1933 | Nebraska Wesleyan University | Lincoln, Nebraska | Inactive | |
| Phi | 1923–1953 | MacPhail College of Music | Minneapolis, Minnesota | Inactive | |
| Chi | 1923–1941 | Macalester College | Saint Paul, Minnesota | Inactive | |
| **Psi** | December 7, 1923 | Knox College | Galesburg, Illinois | Active | |
| Omega | February 28, 1924 – xxxx ? | Chicago Conservatory of Music | Chicago, Illinois | Inactive | |
| **Sigma Alpha** | March 3, 1924 | Illinois Wesleyan University | Bloomington, Illinois | Active | |
| **Sigma Beta** | March 5, 1924 | Ohio University | Athens, Ohio | Active | |
| **Sigma Gamma** | April 23, 1924 | University of Tulsa | Tulsa, Oklahoma | Active | |
| **Sigma Delta** | May 1, 1924 | University of Illinois Urbana-Champaign | Urbana, Illinois | Active | |
| Sigma Epsilon | 1924–1931 | Wisconsin Conservatory of Music | Milwaukee, Wisconsin | Inactive | |
| **Sigma Zeta** | June 3, 1924 | University of Idaho | Moscow, Idaho | Active | |
| **Sigma Eta** | June 4, 1924 – 1935; 1949 | University of Redlands | Redlands, California | Active | |
| **Sigma Theta** | January 16, 1925 | Eastman School of Music | Rochester, New York | Active | |
| **Sigma Iota** | January 24, 1925 | Syracuse University | Syracuse, New York | Active | |
| Sigma Kappa | 1925–1942 | University of Wyoming | Laramie, Wyoming | Inactive | |
| **Sigma Lambda** | June 12, 1925 | Iowa State University | Ames, Iowa | Active | |
| **Sigma Mu** | November 3, 1925 | Hillsdale College | Hillsdale, Michigan | Active | |
| Sigma Nu | 1925–1961 | University of Louisville | Louisville, Kentucky | Inactive | (Note: This chapter formed at the Louisville Conservatory of Music which closed after declaring bankruptcy in 1932 but then merged with the University of Louisville’s part-time non-degree Department of Music.) |
| Sigma Xi | October 26, 1925 – xxxx ? | University of California, Los Angeles | Los Angeles, California | Inactive | |
| **Sigma Omicron** | November 30, 1925 | University of Arkansas | Fayetteville, Arkansas | Active | |
| Sigma Pi | 1926–1935 | MacMurray College | Jacksonville, Illinois | Inactive | |
| Sigma Rho | 1926–1933 | Montana State University | Bozeman, Montana | Inactive | |
| Sigma Sigma | April 23, 1926 – xxxx ? | University of Minnesota | Minneapolis, Minnesota | Inactive | |
| Sigma Tau | June 5, 1926 – xxxx ? | University of Southern California | Los Angeles, California | Inactive | |
| Sigma Upsilon | September 30, 1926 – 1953; 19xx ? – xxxx ? | University of Denver | Denver, Colorado | Inactive | |
| **Sigma Phi** | November 6, 1926 | Louisiana State University | Baton Rouge, Louisiana | Active | |
| **Sigma Chi** | November 30, 1926 | University of Miami | Coral Gables, Florida | Active | |
| Sigma Psi | 1927–1935 | Beloit College | Beloit, Wisconsin | Inactive | |
| **Sigma Omega** | April 29, 1927 | Susquehanna University | Selinsgrove, Pennsylvania | Active | |
| Alpha Alpha | May 27, 1927 – xxxx ? | Bethany College | Lindsborg, Kansas | Inactive | |
| Alpha Beta | October 1, 1927 – xxxx ? | University of Arizona | Tucson, Arizona | Inactive | |
| **Alpha Gamma** | May 4, 1928 – 1961; xxxx ? | Muskingum College | New Concord, Ohio | Active | |
| Alpha Delta | June 2, 1928 – xxxx ? | Wittenberg College | Springfield, Ohio | Inactive | |
| Alpha Epsilon (see Omega) | May 23, 1928 – 1937 | Columbia College Chicago | Chicago, Illinois | Consolidated | (Note: Chapter consolidated with Omega at the Chicago Conservatory of Music.) |
| Alpha Zeta | November 10, 1928 – xxxx ? | Oklahoma City University | Oklahoma City, Oklahoma | Inactive | |
| Alpha Eta | November 10, 1928 – xxxx ? | Oklahoma Baptist University | Shawnee, Oklahoma | Inactive | |
| Alpha Theta | 1929–1943, 1965–xxxx ? | Columbia University | New York City, New York | Inactive | |
| **Alpha Iota** | May 14, 1929 | University of Oklahoma | Norman, Oklahoma | Active | |
| **Alpha Kappa** | April 3, 1930 | Pittsburg State University | Pittsburg, Kansas | Active | |
| **Alpha Lambda** | April 3, 1930 – 1942 | Michigan State University | East Lansing, Michigan | Active | |
| **Alpha Mu** | May 16, 1930 | Carnegie Mellon University | Pittsburgh, Pennsylvania | Active | |
| Alpha Nu | May 23, 1930 – 1942; 1945–xxxx ? | Youngstown State University | Youngstown, Ohio | Inactive | |
| Alpha Xi | 1930–1953 | The Chicago Conservatory College | Chicago, Illinois | Inactive | |
| Alpha Omicron | June 7, 1931 – xxxx ? | Occidental College | Los Angeles, California | Inactive | |
| Alpha Pi | December 13, 1931 – xxxx ? | Fort Hays State University | Hays, Kansas | Inactive | |
| Alpha Rho | 1934–xxxx ? | Our Lady of the Lake College | San Antonio, Texas | Inactive | |
| Alpha Sigma | May 25, 1935 – xxxx ? | University of New Mexico | Albuquerque, New Mexico | Inactive | |
| Alpha Tau | 1935 xxxx ? | Carthage College | Kenosha, Wisconsin | Inactive | |
| **Alpha Upsilon** | April 25, 1936 | University of Northern Iowa | Cedar Falls, Iowa | Active | |
| Alpha Phi | June 13, 1936 – xxxx ? | University of Colorado Boulder | Boulder, Colorado | Inactive | |
| Alpha Chi | 1936–xxxx ? | Oklahoma College of Liberal Arts | Chickasha, Oklahoma | Inactive | |
| Alpha Psi | 1936–1941 | Texas School of Fine Arts | Austin, Texas | Inactive | |
| **Alpha Omega** | April 20, 1937 | University of Mississippi | Oxford, Mississippi | Active | |
| **Iota Alpha** | April 27, 1938 | Oklahoma State University | Stillwater, Oklahoma | Active | |
| **Iota Beta** | February 3, 1939 | Murray State University | Murray, Kentucky | Active | |
| Iota Gamma | April 29, 1939 – xxxx ? | Emporia State University | Emporia, Kansas | Inactive | |
| Iota Delta | June 3, 1939 – xxxx ? | San Diego State University | San Diego, California | Inactive | |
| Iota Epsilon | December 17, 1939 – xxxx ? | Indiana University Bloomington | Bloomington, Indiana | Inactive | |
| **Iota Zeta** | January 30, 1940 | University of Georgia | Athens, Georgia | Active | |
| **Iota Eta** | January 29, 1943 | Indiana State University | Terre Haute, Indiana | Active | |
| **Iota Theta** | May 10, 1941 | University of North Texas | Denton, Texas | Active | |
| Iota Iota | | | | Unassigned ? | |
| Iota Kappa | 1941–xxxx ? | Mississippi University for Women | Columbus, Mississippi | Inactive | |
| **Iota Lambda** | May 24, 1941 | University of Missouri | Columbia, Missouri | Active | |
| Iota Mu | April 27, 1942 – xxxx ? | Drury College | Springfield, Missouri | Inactive | |
| Iota Nu | 1942–1975 | Seton Hill College | Greensburg, Pennsylvania | Inactive | |
| Iota Xi | 1942–1948 | Central YMCA College | Chicago, Illinois | Inactive | (Note: The college closed in 1945.) |
| **Iota Omicron** | February 5, 1943 | University of Southwestern Louisiana | Lafayette, Louisiana | Active | |
| Iota Pi | April 18, 1943 – xxxx ? | Albion College | Albion, Michigan | Inactive | |
| Iota Rho | May 5, 1945 – xxxx ? | Mary Hardin Baylor College | Belton, Texas | Inactive | |
| Iota Sigma (see Tau-Sigma) | February 12, 1946 – 1959 | University of Kansas City | Kansas City, Missouri | Consolidated | |
| **Iota Tau** | April 29, 1946 – 1955; xxxx ? | University of North Carolina at Chapel Hill | Chapel Hill, North Carolina | Active | |
| Iota Upsilon | November 8, 1946 – xxxx ? | Benedictine College | Atchison, Kansas | Inactive | |
| Iota Phi | November 15, 1946 – xxxx ? | Vanderbilt University | Nashville, Tennessee | Inactive | |
| **Iota Chi** | November 18, 1946 | Ball State University | Muncie, Indiana | Active | |
| Iota Psi | January 24, 1947 – xxxx ? | University of Minnesota Duluth | Duluth, Minnesota | Inactive | |
| **Iota Omega** | April 11, 1947 | Texas Woman's University | Denton, Texas | Active | |
| **Beta Alpha** | October 30, 1947 | Florida State University | Tallahassee, Florida | Active | |
| **Beta Beta** | November 14, 1947 | University of Kansas | Lawrence, Kansas | Active | |
| **Beta Gamma** | April 15, 1948 | Bradley University | Peoria, Illinois | Active | |
| **Beta Delta** | May 22, 1948 | University of Puget Sound | Tacoma, Washington | Active | |
| **Beta Epsilon** | November 5, 1948 | University of Evansville | Evansville, Indiana | Active | |
| Beta Zeta | January 14, 1949 – xxxx ? | Meredith College | Raleigh, North Carolina | Inactive | |
| **Beta Eta** | March 25, 1949 | Western Michigan University | Kalamazoo, Michigan | Active | |
| **Beta Theta** | May 12, 1950 | Sam Houston State University | Huntsville, Texas | Active | |
| **Beta Iota** | May 15, 1950 | Northwestern State University | Natchitoches, Louisiana | Active | |
| Beta Kappa | May 20, 1950 – xxxx ? | Texas Wesleyan University | Fort Worth, Texas | Inactive | |
| **Beta Lambda** | April 6, 1951 | Valparaiso University | Valparaiso, Indiana | Active | |
| Beta Mu | May 26, 1951 – 19xx ?; 1993 – 2021 | Northern Illinois University | DeKalb, Illinois | Inactive | |
| Beta Nu | 1951–1969 | Immaculate Heart College | Los Angeles, California | Inactive | (Note: The college closed in 1981.) |
| **Beta Xi** | December 16, 1951 | University of Texas at Austin | Austin, Texas | Active | |
| **Beta Omicron** | May 22, 1952 | Hartwick College | Oneonta, New York | Active | |
| **Beta Pi** | March 28, 1953 | University of Houston | Houston, Texas | Active | |
| **Beta Rho** | April 17, 1953 | Georgia College & State University | Milledgeville, Georgia | Active | |
| **Beta Sigma** | April 23, 1953 | University of Tampa | Tampa, Florida | Active | |
| Sigma (Second) | 1953–1973 | Wayne State University | Detroit, Michigan | Inactive | |
| Beta Tau | April 30, 1954 – xxxx ? | New York University | New York City, New York | Inactive | |
| Beta Upsilon | May 22, 1954 – xxxx ? | California State University, Los Angeles | Los Angeles, California | Inactive | |
| Beta Phi | December 12, 1954 – xxxx ? | Catholic University of America | Washington, D.C. | Inactive | |
| **Beta Chi** | February 20, 1955 | McNeese State University | Lake Charles, Louisiana | Active | |
| **Beta Psi** | May 1, 1955 | East Carolina University | Greenville, North Carolina | Active | |
| Beta Omega | 1955–xxxx ? | Mount St. Mary's College | Los Angeles, California | Inactive | |
| Eta-Iota (see Eta and Iota) | March 5, 1955 – xxxx ? | Cincinnati College-Conservatory of Music | Cincinnati, Ohio | Inactive | |
| Gamma Alpha | May 15, 1955 – xxxx ? | Boston University | Boston, Massachusetts | Inactive | |
| Gamma Beta | June 3, 1955 – xxxx ? | Stanford University | Stanford, California | Inactive | |
| **Gamma Gamma** | April 28, 1957 | Shenandoah University | Winchester, Virginia | Active | (Note: Chaper formed at the Shenandoah Conservatory.) |
| **Gamma Delta** | May 19, 1957 | State University of New York at Potsdam | Potsdam, New York | Active | (Note: Chapter formed at the Crane Conservatory, now part of the State University of New York at Potsdam.) |
| **Gamma Epsilon** | May 26, 1957 | University of Maryland, College Park | College Park, Maryland | Active | |
| Gamma Zeta | December 7, 1957 – xxxx ? | Old Dominion University | Norfolk, Virginia | Inactive | |
| Gamma Eta | April 12, 1958 – 1968; xxxx ? | Agnes Scott College | Decatur, Georgia | Inactive | |
| **Gamma Theta** | April 20, 1958 | Georgia Southern University | Statesboro, Georgia | Active | |
| **Gamma Iota** | December 7, 1958 | James Madison University | Harrisonburg, Virginia | Active | |
| **Gamma Kappa** | February 28, 1959 | Longwood University | Farmville, Virginia | Active | |
| Gamma Lambda | April 15, 1959 – xxxx ? | Wesleyan College | Macon, Georgia | Inactive | |
| Gamma Mu | November 18, 1959 – xxxx ? | Arizona State University | Tempe, Arizona | Inactive | |
| Gamma Nu | May 1, 1959 – xxxx ? | Eastern New Mexico University | Portales, New Mexico | Inactive | |
| Gamma Xi | May 4, 1959 – xxxx ? | Moorhead State University | Moorhead, Minnesota | Inactive | |
| **Gamma Omicron** | May 17, 1959 | Bowling Green State University | Bowling Green, Ohio | Active | |
| Tau-Sigma (see Iota Sigma and Tau) | July 1, 1959 – xxxx ? | University of Missouri–Kansas City Conservatory of Music | Kansas City, Missouri | Inactive | |
| Gamma Pi | August 6, 1959 – xxxx ? | California State University, Long Beach | Long Beach, California | Inactive | |
| **Gamma Rho** | April 23, 1960 | University of Tennessee | Knoxville, Tennessee | Active | |
| Gamma Sigma | April 26, 1960 – xxxx ? | Union University | Jackson, Tennessee | Inactive | |
| **Gamma Tau** | May 15, 1960 | Northern State University | Aberdeen, South Dakota | Active | |
| **Gamma Upsilon** | October 22, 1960 | Morehead State University | Morehead, Kentucky | Active | |
| Gamma Phi | February 4, 1961 – xxxx ? | Hardin–Simmons University | Abilene, Texas | Inactive | |
| Gamma Chi | February 12, 1961 – xxxx ? | California State University, Northridge | Los Angeles, California | Inactive | |
| Gamma Psi | April 22, 1961 – xxxx ? | William Jewell College | Liberty, Missouri | Inactive | |
| Gamma Omega | May 21, 1961 – 1970 | Webster University | Webster Groves, Missouri. | Inactive | |
| **Delta Alpha** | May 20, 1961 | Lebanon Valley College | Annville, Pennsylvania | Active | |
| Delta Beta | March 22, 1962 – xxxx ? | University of Memphis | Memphis, Tennessee | Inactive | |
| **Delta Gamma** | May 13, 1962 | University of Florida | Gainesville, Florida | Active | |
| Delta Delta | May 5, 1963 – xxxx ? | Montclair State University | Montclair, New Jersey | Inactive | |
| **Delta Epsilon** | March 17, 1963 | Southeast Missouri State University | Cape Girardeau, Missouri | Active | |
| **Delta Zeta** | April 29, 1963 | Troy University | Troy, Alabama | Active | |
| **Delta Eta** | May 18, 1963 | Northern Arizona University | Flagstaff, Arizona | Active | |
| Delta Theta | April 29, 1964 – 1972 | Minnesota State University, Mankato | Mankato, Minnesota | Inactive | |
| Delta Iota | May 3, 1964 – xxxx ? | University of Central Oklahoma | Edmond, Oklahoma | Inactive | |
| Delta Kappa | May 17, 1964 – xxxx ? | Minot State University | Minot, North Dakota | Inactive | |
| **Delta Lambda** | May 24, 1964 | State University of New York at Fredonia | Fredonia, New York | Active | |
| **Delta Mu** | December 8, 1964 | Temple University | Philadelphia, Pennsylvania | Active | |
| **Delta Nu** | January 10, 1965 | Howard University | Washington, D.C. | Active | |
| Delta Xi | 1965–1970 | Pacific University | Forest Grove, Oregon | Inactive | |
| Delta Omicron | | | | Unassigned ? | |
| **Delta Pi** | June 8, 1965 | Austin Peay State University | Clarksville, Tennessee | Active | |
| Delta Rho | 1965–xxxx ? | North Central College | Naperville, Illinois | Inactive | |
| **Delta Sigma** | November 7, 1965 | University of Dayton | Dayton, Ohio | Active | |
| **Delta Tau** | November 7, 1965 | Augustana College | Rock Island, Illinois | Active | |
| Delta Upsilon | 1966–1971 | Union College | Schenectady, New York | Inactive | |
| **Delta Phi** | May 13, 1967 | Mansfield University of Pennsylvania | Mansfield, Pennsylvania | Active | |
| **Delta Chi** | November 20, 1966 | University of South Florida | Tampa, Florida | Active | |
| Delta Psi | December 3, 1966 – 1974 | Lincoln University | Jefferson City, Missouri | Inactive | |
| **Delta Omega** | February 11, 1967 | University of Kentucky | Lexington, Kentucky | Active | |
| Epsilon Alpha | October 29, 1967 – xxxx ? | University of Texas at El Paso | El Paso, Texas | Inactive | |
| **Epsilon Beta** | October 19, 1967 | Gettysburg College | Gettysburg, Pennsylvania | Active | |
| **Epsilon Gamma** | November 5, 1967 | Arkansas State University | Jonesboro, Arkansas | Active | |
| Epsilon Delta | November 10, 1967 – xxxx ? | Ouachita Baptist University | Arkadelphia, Arkansas | Inactive | |
| **Epsilon Epsilon** | April 21, 1968 | West Chester University | West Chester, Pennsylvania | Active | |
| Epsilon Zeta | May 12, 1968 – xxxx ? | Boston Conservatory | Boston, Massachusetts | Inactive | |
| Epsilon Eta | August 8, 1968 – xxxx ? | Eastern Illinois University | Charleston, Illinois | Inactive | |
| **Epsilon Theta** | November 16, 1968 | Appalachian State University | Boone, North Carolina | Active | |
| **Epsilon Iota** | March 1, 1969 | University of Tennessee at Martin | Martin, Tennessee | Active | |
| Epsilon Kappa | April 13, 1969 – xxxx ? | Louisiana Tech University | Ruston, Louisiana | Inactive | |
| **Epsilon Lambda** | April 26, 1969 | Belmont University | Nashville, Tennessee | Active | |
| Epsilon Mu | May 5, 1969 – xxxx ? | Northern Michigan University | Marquette, Michigan | Inactive | |
| Epsilon Nu | 1969–xxxx ? | University of Hawaiʻi at Mānoa | Manoa, Honolulu, Hawaii | Inactive | |
| Epsilon Xi | September 27, 1969 – xxxx ? | St. Cloud State University | St. Cloud, Minnesota | Inactive | |
| **Epsilon Omicron** | November 24, 1969 | University of Wisconsin–Eau Claire | Eau Claire, Wisconsin | Active | |
| **Epsilon Pi** | December 6, 1969 | Truman State University | Kirksville, Missouri | Active | (Note: Chapter was formed at Northeast Missouri State University, now Truman State University.) |
| Epsilon Rho | March 10, 1970 – xxxx ? | Northeastern Illinois University | Chicago, Illinois | Inactive | |
| Epsilon Sigma (see Sigma Upsilon) | May 30, 1970 – 1982 | Colorado Women's College | Denver, Colorado | Consolidated | (Note: Chapter consolidated with the Sigma Upsilon chapter when the Colorado Women's College merged into the University of Denver.) |
| Epsilon Tau | January 28, 1971 – xxxx ? | University of Arkansas at Little Rock | Little Rock, Arkansas | Inactive | |
| Epsilon Upsilon | May 6, 1971 – xxxx ? | Adrian College | Adrian, Michigan | Inactive | |
| **Epsilon Phi** | May 8, 1971 | Northwest Missouri State University | Maryville, Missouri | Active | |
| **Epsilon Chi** | April 28, 1971 | Mississippi State University | Mississippi State, Mississippi | Active | |
| Epsilon Psi | October 17, 1971 – xxxx ? | Fairmont State University | Fairmont, West Virginia | Inactive | |
| **Epsilon Omega** | November 13, 1971 | University of Central Missouri | Warrensburg, Missouri | Active | |
| Zeta Alpha | November 28, 1971 – xxxx ? | Wichita State University | Wichita, Kansas | Inactive | |
| Zeta Beta | March 3, 1973 – xxxx ? | Wayland Baptist University | Plainview, Texas | Inactive | |
| **Zeta Gamma** | March 27, 1972 | University of South Alabama | Mobile, Alabama | Active | |
| Zeta Delta | March 30, 1972 – xxxx ? | Houston Baptist University | Houston, Texas | Inactive | |
| **Zeta Epsilon** | May 12, 1972 | University of Iowa | Iowa City, Iowa | Active | |
| Zeta Zeta | June 10, 1972 – xxxx ? | Kean University | Union Township, New Jersey | Inactive | |
| Zeta Eta | October 28, 1972 – xxxx ? | West Virginia Wesleyan College | Buckhannon, West Virginia | Inactive | |
| **Zeta Theta** | November 11, 1972 | Valdosta State University | Valdosta, Georgia | Active | |
| Zeta Iota | May 2, 1964 – xxxx ? | Wright State University, Dayton campus | Dayton, Ohio | Inactive | |
| Zeta Kappa | May 19, 1973 – xxxx ? | Southern Oregon University | Ashland, Oregon | Inactive | |
| Zeta Lambda | November 3, 1973 – xxxx ? | Southern Arkansas University | Magnolia, Arkansas | Inactive | |
| Zeta Mu | 1973–xxxx ? | Western Connecticut State University | Danbury, Connecticut | Inactive | |
| **Zeta Nu** | April 27, 1974 | University of Texas at Arlington | Arlington, Texas | Active | |
| Zeta Xi | May 17, 1974 – xxxx ? | Berry College | Mount Berry, Georgia | Inactive | |
| Zeta Omicron | November 23, 1974 | Lipscomb University | Nashville, Tennessee | Inactive | |
| Zeta Pi | 1975–xxxx ? | Central Connecticut State University | New Britain, Connecticut | Inactive | |
| **Zeta Rho** | May 4, 1975 | Arkansas Tech University | Russellville, Arkansas | Active | |
| Zeta Sigma | November 15, 1975 – xxxx ? | Angelo State University | San Angelo, Texas | Inactive | |
| **Zeta Tau** | February 14, 1976 | University of Central Florida | Orlando, Florida | Active | |
| Zeta Upsilon | October 31, 1976 – xxxx ? | Edinboro University of Pennsylvania | Edinboro, Pennsylvania | Inactive | |
| Zeta Phi | April 7, 1979 – xxxx ? | Spelman College | Atlanta, Georgia | Inactive | |
| **Zeta Chi** | April 23, 1977 | University of Central Arkansas | Conway, Arkansas | Active | |
| Zeta Psi | May 12, 1979 – xxxx ? | Purdue University Fort Wayne | Fort Wayne, Indiana | Inactive | |
| Zeta Omega | November 11, 1979 – xxxx ? | Limestone College | Gaffney, South Carolina | Inactive | |
| Eta Alpha | April 25, 1981 – xxxx ? | Mount Senario College | Ladysmith, Wisconsin | Inactive | |
| **Eta Beta** | April 26, 1980 | University of North Carolina at Pembroke | Pembroke, North Carolina | Active | |
| Eta Gamma | 198x ?–xxxx ? | University of West Georgia | Carrollton, Georgia | Inactive | |
| **Eta Delta** | May 30, 1981 | Kennesaw State University | Kennesaw, Georgia | Active | |
| **Eta Epsilon** | July 31, 1981 | Missouri Western State University | St. Joseph, Missouri | Active | |
| **Eta Zeta** | April 17, 1982 | Grambling State University | Grambling, Louisiana | Active | |
| Eta Eta | March 3, 1984 – xxxx ? | East Texas Baptist University | Marshall, Texas | Inactive | |
| **Eta Theta** | May 6, 1984 | Western Carolina University | Cullowhee, North Carolina | Active | |
| Eta Iota | 1984 ?–xxxx ? | University of Cincinnati | Cincinnati, Ohio | Inactive | |
| Eta Kappa | July 27, 1984 – xxxx ? | Metropolitan State College | Denver, Colorado | Inactive | |
| **Eta Lambda** | May 16, 1987 | Centenary College of Louisiana | Shreveport, Louisiana | Active | |
| Eta Mu | May 27, 1987 – xxxx ? | University of Hartford | West Hartford, Connecticut | Inactive | |
| **Eta Nu** | May 7, 1988 | Hastings College | Hastings, Nebraska | Active | |
| **Eta Xi** | April 8, 1989 | Central Michigan University | Mount Pleasant, Michigan | Active | |
| Eta Omicron | April 23, 1989 – xxxx ? | University of Nevada, Reno | Reno, Nevada | Inactive | |
| Eta Pi | April 28, 1990 – xxxx ? | Stetson University | DeLand, Florida | Inactive | |
| **Eta Rho** | May 6, 1990 | University of Delaware | Newark, Delaware | Active | |
| **Eta Sigma** | January 19, 1991 | Eastern Kentucky University | Richmond, Kentucky | Active | |
| **Eta Tau** | April 27, 1991 | Shepherd University | Shepherdstown, West Virginia | Active | |
| Eta Upsilon | April 27, 1991 – xxxx ? | Radford University | Radford, Virginia | Inactive | |
| Eta Phi | May 4, 1991 – xxxx ? | Pennsylvania State University | University Park, Pennsylvania | Inactive | |
| Eta Chi | April 11, 1992 – xxxx ? | Southern Illinois University Edwardsville | Edwardsville, Illinois | Inactive | |
| **Eta Psi** | April 25, 1992 | Northern Kentucky University | Highland Heights, Kentucky | Active | |
| **Eta Omega** | April 25, 1992 | University of the Pacific | Stockton, California | Active | |
| **Theta Alpha** | May 31, 1992 | Ohio State University | Columbus, Ohio | Active | |
| **Theta Beta** | April 17, 1993 | Jacksonville State University | Jacksonville, Alabama | Active | |
| **Theta Gamma** | May 1, 1993 | University of Texas at San Antonio | San Antonio, Texas | Active | |
| **Theta Delta** | April 30, 1994 | University of Alabama | Tuscaloosa, Alabama | Active | |
| **Theta Epsilon** | April 29, 1995 | California State University, Stanislaus | Turlock, California | Active | |
| Theta Zeta | April 22, 1995 – xxxx ? | Alabama A&M University | Normal, Alabama | Inactive | |
| **Theta Eta** | March 30, 1996 | Alma College | Alma, Michigan | Active | |
| **Theta Theta** | April 20, 1996 | Nicholls State University | Thibodaux, Louisiana | Active | |
| **Theta Iota** | April 26, 1996 | University of Wisconsin–Platteville | Platteville, Wisconsin | Active | |
| **Theta Kappa** | May 4, 1996 | William Paterson University | Wayne, New Jersey | Active | |
| **Theta Lambda** | February 15, 1997 | Furman University | Greenville, South Carolina | Active | |
| Theta Mu | February 22, 1997 – xxxx ? | University of Tennessee at Chattanooga | Chattanooga, Tennessee | Inactive | |
| **Theta Nu** | April 5, 1997 | Florida A&M University | Tallahassee, Florida | Active | |
| **Theta Xi** | April 12, 1997 | Bethune–Cookman University | Daytona Beach, Florida | Active | |
| **Theta Omicron** | April 12, 1997 | Central Methodist University | Fayette, Missouri | Active | |
| Theta Pi | April 19, 1997 – xxxx ? | Christopher Newport University | Newport News, Virginia | Inactive | |
| Theta Rho | 199x ?–xxxx ? | Missouri State University | Springfield, Missouri | Inactive | |
| Theta Sigma | February 21, 1998 – xxxx ? | Clayton College and State University | Morrow, Georgia | Inactive | |
| **Theta Tau** | May 2, 1998 | Southern Illinois University Carbondale | Carbondale, Illinois | Active | |
| **Theta Upsilon** | May 16, 1998 | New Jersey City University | Jersey City, New Jersey | Active | |
| Theta Phi | January 23, 1999 – xxxx ? | University of North Florida | Jacksonville, Florida | Inactive | |
| **Theta Chi** | February 14, 1999 | University of South Carolina | Columbia, South Carolina | Active | |
| **Theta Psi** | April 24, 1999 | Loyola University New Orleans | New Orleans, Louisiana | Active | |
| **Theta Omega** | May 2, 1999 | Texas State University | San Marcos, Texas | Active | |
| **Kappa Alpha** | June 1, 1999 | Rowan University | Glassboro, New Jersey | Active | |
| **Kappa Beta** | September 5, 1999 | Indiana University of Pennsylvania | Indiana, Pennsylvania | Active | |
| **Kappa Gamma** | October 23, 1999 | University of North Carolina at Greensboro | Greensboro, North Carolina | Active | |
| Kappa Delta | May 5, 2000 – 20xx ? | Clark Atlanta University | Atlanta, Georgia | Inactive | |
| **Kappa Epsilon** | May 13, 2000 | University of Southern Mississippi | Hattiesburg, Mississippi | Active | |
| Kappa Zeta | August 4, 2000 – 20xx ? | New Mexico State University | Las Cruces, New Mexico | Inactive | |
| Kappa Eta | 200x ?–20xx ? | Clarion University of Pennsylvania | Clarion, Pennsylvania | Inactive | |
| Kappa Theta | April 28, 2001 – 20xx ? | University of Nevada, Las Vegas | Paradise, Nevada | Inactive | |
| **Kappa Iota** | May 5, 2001 | Tennessee State University | Nashville, Tennessee | Inactive | |
| **Kappa Kappa** | April 19, 2002 | Southern University and A&M College | Baton Rouge, Louisiana | Active | |
| **Kappa Lambda** | April 27, 2002 | West Virginia University | Morgantown, West Virginia | Active | |
| **Kappa Mu** | May 4, 2002 | Alabama State University | Montgomery, Alabama | Active | |
| **Kappa Nu** | May 4, 2002 | Lindenwood University | St. Charles, Missouri | Active | |
| Kappa Xi | May 25, 2002 – 20xx ? | Morgan State University | Baltimore, Maryland | Inactive | |
| Kappa Omicron | May 16, 2003 – 20xx ? | Texas Southern University | Houston, Texas | Inactive | |
| Kappa Pi | February 15, 2003 – 20xx ? | Middle Tennessee State University | Murfreesboro, Tennessee | Inactive | |
| Kappa Rho | February 21, 2003 – 20xx ? | Langston University | Langston, Oklahoma | Inactive | |
| **Kappa Sigma** | April 26, 2003 | Saint Mary's University of Minnesota | Winona, Minnesota | Active | |
| **Kappa Tau** | May 9, 2003 | Capital University | Bexley, Ohio | Active | |
| **Kappa Upsilon** | June 7, 2003 | Kansas State University | Manhattan, Kansas | Active | |
| **Kappa Phi** | May 24, 2003 | Auburn University | Auburn, Alabama | Active | |
| Kappa Chi | 2003 ? | University of Alabama at Birmingham | Birmingham, Alabama | Inactive | |
| **Kappa Psi** | May 31, 2003 | California State University, Fresno | Fresno, California | Active | |
| Kappa Omega | June 7, 2003 – 20xx ? | Elmhurst College | Elmhurst, Illinois | Inactive | |
| Lambda Alpha | December 6, 2003 – 20xx ? | East Tennessee State University | Johnson City, Tennessee | Inactive | |
| **Lambda Beta** | April 17, 2004 | Mars Hill University | Mars Hill, North Carolina | Active | |
| Lambda Gamma | May 1, 2004 – 20xx ? | Texas A&M University–Corpus Christi | Corpus Christi, Texas | Inactive | |
| Lambda Delta | April 24, 2004 – 20xx ? | VanderCook College of Music | Chicago, Illinois | Inactive | |
| Lambda Epsilon | May 7, 2004 – 20xx ? | Howard Payne University | Brownwood, Texas | Inactive | |
| **Lambda Zeta** | December 4, 2004 | Prairie View A&M University | Prairie View, Texas | Active | |
| Lambda Eta | December 11, 2004 – 20xx ? | Lee University | Cleveland, Tennessee | Inactive | |
| Lambda Theta | October 30, 2005 – 20xx ? | Frostburg State University | Frostburg, Maryland | Inactive | |
| **Lambda Iota** | May 7, 2006 | Rollins College | Winter Park, Florida | Active | |
| Lambda Kappa | April 21, 2007 – 20xx ? | Alderson-Broaddus College | Philippi, West Virginia | Inactive | |
| **Lambda Lambda** | April 28, 2007 | Texas A&M University–Kingsville | Kingsville, Texas | Active | |
| **Lambda Mu** | January 19, 2008 | Illinois State University | Normal, Illinois | Active | |
| **Lambda Nu** | April 5, 2008 | University of Arkansas at Pine Bluff | Pine Bluff, Arkansas | Active | |
| **Lambda Xi** | November 15, 2008 | South Carolina State University | Orangeburg, South Carolina | Active | |
| **Lambda Omicron** | January 30, 2010 | Florida International University | University Park, Florida | Active | |
| **Lamba Pi** | May 9, 2011 | Florida Atlantic University | Boca Raton, Florida | Active | |
| Lambda Rho | November 11, 2011 – 20xx ? | Norfolk State University | Norfolk, Virginia | Inactive | |
| Lambda Sigma | April 17, 2010 – 20xx ? | Columbus State University Schwob School of Music | Columbus, Georgia | Inactive | |
| **Lambda Tau** | May 7, 2010 | Westminster Choir College at Rider University | Lawrence Township, Mercer County, New Jersey | Active | |
| **Lambda Upsilon** | April 30, 2011 | Miami University | Oxford, Ohio | Active | |
| **Lambda Phi** | January 16, 2011 | University of Massachusetts Amherst | Amherst, Massachusetts | Active | |
| **Lambda Chi** | May 20, 2010 | California State University, Fullerton | Fullerton, California | Active | |
| Lambda Psi | November 18, 2011 – 20xx ? | University of North Alabama | Florence, Alabama | Inactive | |
| Lambda Omega | March 25, 2011 – 20xx ? | North Carolina Central University | Durham, North Carolina | Inactive | |
| **Mu Alpha** | April 23, 2011 | Grand Valley State University | Allendale, Michigan | Active | |
| **Mu Beta** | May 13, 2011 | Virginia State University | Ettrick, Virginia | Active | |
| Mu Gamma | May 1, 2011 – 20xx ? | Hampton University | Hampton, Virginia | Inactive | |
| **Mu Delta** | December 10, 2011 | University of Toledo | Toledo, Ohio | Active | |
| **Mu Epsilon** | December 3, 2011 | George Mason University | Fairfax, Virginia | Active | |
| **Mu Zeta** | April 29, 2012 | Kutztown University of Pennsylvania | Kutztown, Pennsylvania | Active | |
| **Mu Eta** | June 13, 2015 | University of Montevallo | Montevallo, Alabama | Active | |
| Mu Theta | April 12, 2014 – 20xx ? | Texas A&M University–Commerce | Commerce, Texas | Inactive | |
| **Mu Iota** | April 22, 2017 | Western Kentucky University | Bowling Green, Kentucky | Active | |
| **Mu Kappa** | November 16, 2013 | Western Illinois University | Macomb, Illinois | Active | |
| Mu Lambda | April 26, 2014 – 20xx ? | Wingate University | Wingate, North Carolina | Inactive | |
| **Mu Mu** | May 3, 2014 | Henderson State University | Arkadelphia, Arkansas | Active | |
| **Mu Nu** | April 10, 2015 | Winthrop University | Rock Hill, South Carolina | Active | |
| Mu Xi | April 18, 2015 – 20xx ? | Chicago College of Performing Arts | Chicago, Illinois | Inactive | |
| Mu Omicron | April 18, 2015 – 20xx ? | Bethel University | McKenzie, Tennessee | Inactive | |
| Mu Pi | November 12, 2015 – 20xx ? | Fisk University | Nashville, Tennessee | Inactive | |
| **Mu Rho** | April 25, 2015 | Southeastern Louisiana University | Hammond, Louisiana | Active | |
| **Mu Sigma** | April 3, 2016 | Lincoln University | Lincoln University, Pennsylvania | Active | |
| **Mu Tau** | April 23, 2017 | Colorado State University | Fort Collins, Colorado | Active | |
| **Mu Upsilon** | April 7, 2017 | Jackson State University | Jackson, Mississippi | Active | |
| Mu Phi | | | | Inactive | |
| **Mu Chi** | January 28, 2017 | Ohio Northern University | Ada, Ohio | Active | |
| **Mu Psi** | December 8, 2020 | University of North Carolina at Charlotte | Charlotte, North Carolina | Active | |
| Mu Omega | 20xx ?–20xx ? | University of Louisiana at Monroe | Monroe, Louisiana | Inactive | |
| **Nu Alpha** | May 12, 2019 | The College of New Jersey | Ewing Township, New Jersey | Active | |
| **Nu Beta** | November 19, 2017 | Southwestern Oklahoma State University | Weatherford, Oklahoma | Active | |
| **Nu Gamma** | May 4, 2019 | Stephen F. Austin State University | Nacogdoches, Texas | Active | |
| Nu Delta | May 6, 2018 – 20xx ? | Towson University | Towson, Maryland | Inactive | |
| Nu Epsilon | | | | Inactive | |
| **Nu Zeta** | December 4, 2021 | Oakland University | Rochester Hills, Michigan | Active | |
| **Nu Theta** | | Texas Tech University | Lubbock, Texas | Colony | |

== Alumnae chapters ==
In the following list of alumnae chapters, active chapters are indicated in bold and inactive chapters are in italics.

| Chapter | Charter date | Location | Status | Ref. |
|---|---|---|---|---|
| **Indianapolis Alumnae** | December 1, 1924 | Indianapolis, Indiana | Active | |
| **Chicago Alumnae** | January 1, 1928 | Chicago, Illinois | Active | |
| Los Angeles Alumnae | January 1, 1928 | Los Angeles, California | Inactive | |
| **Terre Haute Alumnae** | January 1, 1928 | Terre Haute, Indiana | Active | |
| **Rochester Alumnae** | April 5, 1930 | Rochester, New York | Active | |
| **Bloomington/Normal Alumnae** | January 1, 1931 | Bloomington, Illinois | Active | |
| **Bloomington/Normal Alumnae** | January 1, 1931 | Normal, Illinois | Active | |
| **New York City Alumnae** | January 1, 1932 | New York City, New York | Active | |
| **Lincoln Alumnae** | December 29, 1933 | Lincoln, Nebraska | Active | |
| **Pittsburgh Alumnae** | March 10, 1935 | Pittsburgh, Pennsylvania | Active | |
| **Selinsgrove Alumnae** | November 1, 1935 | Selinsgrove, Pennsylvania | Active | |
| **Des Moines Alumnae** | November 17, 1935 | Des Moines, Iowa | Active | |
| Twin Cities Alumnae | January 1, 1937 | Minneapolis, Minnesota | Inactive | |
| Hays Alumnae | March 31, 1937 | Hays, Kansas | Inactive | |
| **Lansing/East Lansing Alumnae** | January 1, 1938 | East Lansing, Michigan | Active | |
| **Lansing/East Lansing Alumnae** | January 1, 1938 | Lansing, Michigan | Active | |
| **Tucson, Arizona Alumnae** | January 29, 1938 | Tucson, Arizona | Active | |
| **Decatur Alumnae** | October 8, 1938 | Decatur, Illinois | Active | |
| Albuquerque Alumnae | January 10, 1939 | Albuquerque, New Mexico | Inactive | |
| **Kansas City, MO Alumnae** | February 18, 1939 | Kansas City, Missouri | Active | |
| **Warren-Youngstown Alumnae** | April 25, 1939 | Warren, Ohio | Active | |
| **Warren-Youngstown Alumnae** | April 25, 1939 | Youngstown, Ohio | Active | |
| **Oklahoma City Alumnae** | November 21, 1939 | Oklahoma City, Oklahoma | Active | |
| **Miami Alumnae** | January 23, 1940 | Miami, Florida | Active | |
| **Denver Alumnae** | March 22, 1940 | Denver, Colorado | Active | |
| **Pasadena Alumnae** | April 20, 1940 | Pasadena, California | Active | |
| Pittsburg, Kansas Alumnae | June 11, 1941 | Pittsburg, Kansas | Inactive | |
| **St. Louis Alumnae** | November 5, 1943 | St. Louis, Missouri | Active | |
| **Tulsa Alumnae** | November 9, 1943 | Tulsa, Oklahoma | Active | |
| **Dallas Alumnae** | November 15, 1943 | Dallas, Texas | Active | |
| **San Francisco Peninsula Alumnae** | January 1, 1944 | San Francisco, California | Active | |
| San Francisco Alumnae | February 5, 1944 | San Francisco, California | Consolidated | |
| **San Diego County, California Alumnae** | June 2, 1944 | San Diego County, California | Active | |
| **Washington, D.C. Alumnae** | December 4, 1944 | Washington, D.C. | Active | |
| **Atlanta Alumnae** | April 6, 1945 | Atlanta, Georgia | Active | |
| **Ann Arbor Alumnae** | June 12, 1945 | Ann Arbor, Michigan | Active | |
| **Cleveland Alumnae** | February 24, 1946 | Cleveland, Ohio | Active | |
| **Fort Worth Alumnae** | October 5, 1946 | Fort Worth, Texas | Active | |
| **Oak Park Alumnae** | October 13, 1946 | Oak Park, Illinois | Active | |
| **Detroit Alumnae** | October 14, 1946 | Detroit, Michigan | Active | |
| Grosse Pointe Alumnae | October 14, 1946 | Grosse Pointe, Michigan | Inactive | |
| **Evansville Alumnae** | February 20, 1947 | Evansville, Indiana | Active | |
| Waterloo Alumnae | April 18, 1947 | Waterloo, Iowa | Inactive | |
| **Houston Alumnae** | April 29, 1947 | Houston, Texas | Active | |
| St Paul/Minneapolis Alumnae | January 1, 1948 | Saint Paul, Minnesota | Inactive | |
| **Evanston Alumnae** | November 1, 1948 | Evanston, Illinois | Active | |
| **San Antonio Alumnae** | November 8, 1948 | San Antonio, Texas | Active | |
| Lindsborg Alumnae | November 14, 1948 | Lindsborg, Kansas | Inactive | |
| Syracuse Alumnae | November 16, 1948 | Syracuse, New York | Inactive | |
| **Boston Alumnae** | November 20, 1948 | Boston, Massachusetts | Active | |
| **Nashville Alumnae** | January 16, 1949 | Nashville, Tennessee | Inactive | |
| Portland Alumnae | February 26, 1949 | Portland, Oregon | Inactive | |
| **Urbana Alumnae** | March 12, 1949 | Urbana, Illinois | Active | |
| **Long Beach Alumnae** | March 15, 1949 | Long Beach, California | Active | |
| **Urbana Alumni** | March 12, 1949 | Urbana, Illinois | Active | |
| **Boulder Alumnae** | June 11, 1949 | Boulder, Colorado | Active | |
| **Peoria Alumnae** | November 13, 1949 | Peoria, Illinois | Active | |
| **Kalamazoo Alumnae** | January 19, 1950 | Kalamazoo, Michigan | Active | |
| **Fargo/Moorhead Alumnae** | May 21, 1950 | Fargo, North Dakota | Active | |
| **Fargo/Moorhead Alumnae** | May 21, 1950 | Moorhead, Minnesota | Active | |
| **Philadelphia Alumni** | May 23, 1950 | Philadelphia, Pennsylvania | Active | |
| Springfield Alumnae | June 12, 1950 | Springfield, Ohio | Inactive | |
| La Grange Alumnae | August 22, 1950 | La Grange, Illinois | Inactive | |
| **Seattle Alumnae** | May 8, 1951 | Seattle, Washington | Active | |
| **Buffalo Alumnae** | April 29, 1952 | Buffalo, New York | Active | |
| **Tacoma Alumnae** | June 10, 1952 | Tacoma, Washington | Active | |
| **Milwaukee Alumnae** | March 23, 1953 | Milwaukee, Wisconsin | Active | |
| **Cincinnati Alumnae** | October 10, 1954 | Cincinnati, Ohio | Active | |
| Memphis Alumnae | November 15, 1955 | Memphis, Tennessee | Active | |
| **Austin Alumnae** | March 17, 1956 | Austin, Texas | Active | |
| **Rockford Alumnae** | May 19, 1956 | Rockford, Illinois | Active | |
| **Tampa Alumnae** | June 2, 1956 | Tampa, Florida | Active | |
| **Madison Alumnae** | June 7, 1956 | Madison, Wisconsin | Active | |
| San Fernando Valley Alumnae | July 2, 1956 | San Fernando, California | Inactive | |
| Whittier Alumnae | July 6, 1956 | Whittier, California | Inactive | |
| Orlando Alumnae | April 4, 1957 | Orlando, Florida | Active | |
| St. Petersburg Alumnae | April 4, 1957 | St. Petersburg, Florida | Inactive | |
| Hollywood Alumnae | December 7, 1957 | Hollywood, Los Angeles | Inactive | |
| **Muncie Alumnae** | March 2, 1958 | Muncie, Indiana | Active | |
| Savannah Alumnae | January 1, 1959 | Savannah, Georgia | Inactive | |
| Lake Charles Alumnae | May 1, 1959 | Lake Charles, Louisiana | Inactive | |
| **Dayton Alumnae** | May 18, 1959 | Dayton, Ohio | Active | |
| Jacksonville Alumnae | April 21, 1959 | Jacksonville, Florida | Inactive | |
| **Phoenix Alumnae** | April 27, 1959 | Phoenix, Arizona | Active | |
| **Orange County, California Alumnae** | November 15, 1959 | Orange County, California | Active | |
| **Denton Alumnae** | December 5, 1959 | Denton, Texas | Active | |
| **Knoxville Alumnae** | April 23, 1960 | Knoxville, Tennessee | Active | |
| **Lawrence Alumnae** | April 20, 1961 | Lawrence, Kansas | Active | |
| **Moscow/Pullman Alumnae** | October 28, 1961 | Moscow, Idaho | Active | |
| **Moscow/Pullman Alumnae** | October 28, 1961 | Pullman, Washington | Active | |
| **East Bay Alumnae** | November 4, 1961 | East Bay, California | Active | |
| Santa Clara Valley Alumnae | April 28, 1962 | Santa Clara, California | Inactive | |
| Abilene Alumnae | May 19, 1962 | Abilene, Texas | Inactive | |
| **Baltimore Alumnae** | June 24, 1962 | Baltimore, Maryland | Active | |
| Omaha Alumnae | August 16, 1962 | Omaha, Nebraska | Inactive | |
| Covina Alumnae | October 26, 1962 | Covina, California | Inactive | |
| **Bloomington Alumnae** | March 23, 1963 | Bloomington, Indiana | Active | |
| **Fort Lauderdale Alumnae** | May 18, 1963 | Fort Lauderdale, Florida | Active | |
| **Northern New Jersey Alumnae** | November 12, 1963 | Northern New Jersey | Active | |
| Park Ridge Alumnae | October 2, 1964 | Park Ridge, Illinois | Inactive | |
| **Lexington Alumnae** | May 22, 1965 | Lexington, Kentucky | Active | |
| **Grand Rapids Alumnae** | August 12, 1965 | Grand Rapids, Michigan | Active | |
| **Lake County Alumnae** | November 6, 1965 | Lake County, Indiana | Active | |
| **Wichita Alumnae** | November 6, 1965 | Wichita, Kansas | Active | |
| Liberty Alumnae | January 15, 1966 | Liberty, Missouri | Inactive | |
| Minot Alumnae | May 17, 1966 | Minot, North Dakota | Inactive | |
| **Riverside/San Bernardino Counties Alumnae** | October 22, 1966 | Riverside County, California | Active | |
| **Riverside/San Bernardino Counties Alumnae** | October 22, 1966 | San Bernardino County, California | Active | |
| **Pontchartrain Alumnae** | April 1, 1967 | Detroit, Michigan | Active | |
| **Fayetteville Alumnae** | May 13, 1967 | Fayetteville, Arkansas | Active | |
| **Lafayette Alumnae** | May 20, 1967 | Lafayette, Louisiana | Active | |
| El Paso Alumnae | October 28, 1967 | El Paso, Texas | Inactive | |
| **Arlington Alumnae** | May 18, 1968 | Arlington, Texas | Active | |
| Grand Forks Alumnae | May 19, 1968 | Grand Forks, North Dakota | Inactive | |
| Harrisburg Alumnae | October 20, 1968 | Harrisburg, Pennsylvania | Inactive | |
| **Columbia Alumnae** | May 17, 1969 | Columbia, Missouri | Active | |
| Moorhead Alumnae | November 15, 1969 | Moorhead, Minnesota | Inactive | |
| **Tallahassee Alumnae** | November 16, 1969 | Tallahassee, Florida | Active | |
| Quad Cities | May 3, 1970 | Quad Cities, Iowa | Inactive | |
| Galesburg Alumnae | May 15, 1970 | Galesburg, Illinois | Inactive | |
| Sacramento Alumnae | May 17, 1970 | Sacramento, California | Inactive | |
| **Columbus Alumnae** | May 24, 1970 | Columbus, Ohio | Active | |
| **Charlotte Alumnae** | June 1, 1971 | Charlotte, North Carolina | Active | |
| **Fort Wayne Alumnae** | April 15, 1972 | Fort Wayne, Indiana | Active | |
| **Central New Jersey Alumnae** | May 21, 1972 | Central New Jersey | Active | |
| **New Orleans Alumnae** | April 7, 1973 | New Orleans, Louisiana | Active | |
| Charleston Alumnae | May 25, 1973 | Charleston, Illinois | Inactive | |
| Murray Alumnae | June 11, 1973 | Murray, Kentucky | Inactive | |
| Flint Alumnae | October 26, 1974 | Flint, Michigan | Inactive | |
| **Clarksville Alumnae** | February 15, 1975 | Clarksville, Tennessee | Active | |
| **Northwest Ohio Alumnae** | November 8, 1975 | Northwest Ohio | Active | |
| Emporia Alumnae | May 1, 1976 | Emporia, Kansas | Inactive | |
| **Jonesboro Alumnae** | October 23, 1976 | Jonesboro, Arkansas | Active | |
| Springfield, Missouri Alumnae | October 30, 1976 | Springfield, Missouri | Inactive | |
| Kirksville Alumnae | April 30, 1977 | Kirksville, Missouri | Inactive | |
| South Carolina Alumnae | September 30, 1977 | South Carolina | Inactive | |
| **Edmond Alumnae** | June 2, 1978 | Edmond, Oklahoma | Active | |
| Greater Hartford | June 2, 1978 | Hartford, Connecticut | Inactive | |
| Houston Bay Area Alumnae | June 28, 1978 | Houston, Texas | Inactive | |
| **Sarasota-Manatee Alumnae** | October 28, 1978 | Sarasota, Florida | Active | |
| **Sarasota-Manatee Alumnae** | October 28, 1978 | Manatee County, Florida | Active | |
| **Hot Springs Alumnae** | July 20, 1980 | Hot Springs, Arkansas | Active | |
| Tri-Cities Alumnae | November 1, 1980 | Binghamton, New York | Inactive | |
| **Iowa City Alumnae** | May 2, 1981 | Iowa City, Iowa | Active | |
| Flagstaff Alumnae | September 12, 1981 | Flagstaff, Arizona | Inactive | |
| Hawaii Alumnae | May 8, 1982 | Hawaii | Inactive | |
| St. Cloud Alumnae | July 9, 1982 | St. Cloud, Minnesota | Inactive | |
| Northwest Georgia Alumnae | October 3, 1982 | Northwest Georgia | Inactive | |
| **Minneapolis/St. Paul Alumnae** | October 23, 1982 | Minneapolis, Minnesota | Active | |
| **Minneapolis/St. Paul Alumnae** | October 23, 1982 | Saint Paul, Minnesota | Active | |
| **Gainesville Alumnae** | February 12, 1983 | Gainesville, Florida | Active | |
| **Raleigh/Durham Alumnae** | April 13, 1983 | Durham, North Carolina | Active | |
| **Raleigh/Durham Alumnae** | April 13, 1983 | Raleigh, North Carolina | Active | |
| Greater Boone Alumnae | April 14, 1983 | Boone, North Carolina | Inactive | |
| **Aberdeen Alumnae** | September 30, 1984 | Aberdeen, South Dakota | Active | |
| Little Rock Alumnae | March 15, 1986 | Little Rock, Arkansas | Inactive | |
| South Georgia Alumnae | January 9, 1988 | Valdosta, Georgia | Inactive | |
| **East Texas Alumnae** | September 17, 1988 | East Texas | Active | |
| **Richmond Alumnae** | November 11, 1989 | Richmond, Virginia | Active | |
| Norman Alumnae | June 17, 1995 | Norman, Oklahoma | Inactive | |
| **Reno Alumnae** | October 22, 1995 | Reno, Nevada | Active | |
| Melbourne-Vero Beach Alumnae | May 19, 1996 | Melbourne, Florida | Inactive | |
| Melbourne-Vero Beach Alumnae | May 19, 1996 | Vero Beach, Florida | Inactive | |
| Edwardsville Alumnae | June 13, 1998 | Edwardsville, Illinois | Inactive | |
| **Winchester Alumnae** | February 12, 2000 | Winchester, Virginia | Active | |
| Salisbury Alumnae | August 26, 2000 | Salisbury, Maryland | Inactive | |
| Baton Rouge Alumnae | September 2, 2000 | Baton Rouge, Louisiana | Inactive | |
| **Volusia County Alumnae** | November 3, 2000 | Volusia County, Florida | Active | |
| Spokane Alumnae | November 10, 2001 | Spokane, Washington | Inactive | |
| **Midland Alumnae** | November 17, 2001 | Midland, Michigan | Active | |
| **Las Vegas Alumnae** | February 28, 2003 | Las Vegas, Nevada | Active | |
| Stanislaus County Alumnae | June 1, 2003 | Stanislaus County, California | Inactive | |
| **Statesboro Alumnae** | June 12, 2004 | Statesboro, Georgia | Active | |
| **Northern Delaware** | April 8, 2006 | Wilmington, Delaware | Active | |
| **Hampton Roads Alumnae** | June 16, 2007 | Hampton Roads, Virginia | Active | |
| **Colorado Springs Alumnae** | September 24, 2016 | Colorado Springs, Colorado | Active | |
| **Asheville Alumnae** | May 6, 2017 | Asheville, North Carolina | Active | |
| **Huntsville Alumnae** | October 28, 2018 | Huntsville, Alabama | Active | |
| **Mobile Alumnae** | May 14, 2022 | Mobile, Alabama | Active | |
| **Jackson Alumnae** | May 22, 2022 | Jackson, Tennessee | Active | |
| **South Atlanta Alumnae** | August 27, 2022 | Atlanta, Georgia | Active | |
| **McDonough Alumnae** | August 27, 2022 | McDonough, Georgia | Active | |
| **Morehead Alumnae** | April 21, 2024 | Morehead, Kentucky | Active | |
