= List of Gamma Phi Beta chapters =

Gamma Phi Beta is an international college sorority. It was founded in Syracuse University in 1874 and was the first of the Greek organizations to call itself a sorority. Following are the chapters of Gamma Phi Beta, with active chapters indicated in bold and inactive chapters and institutions in italics.

Chapter	Charter dates and range	Institution	Location	Status	Ref.
**Alpha**	November 11, 1874	Syracuse University	Syracuse, New York	Active	
**Beta**	June 7, 1882 – 2007; 2015	University of Michigan	Ann Arbor, Michigan	Active	
**Gamma**	November 14, 1885	University of Wisconsin–Madison	Madison, Wisconsin	Active	
**Delta**	April 12, 1887 – 1970; 1985	Boston University	Boston, Massachusetts	Active	
**Epsilon**	October 11, 1888 – 2020; 2026	Northwestern University	Evanston, Illinois	Active	
Zeta	November 24, 1882 – 1950	Goucher College	Towson, Maryland	Inactive	
**Eta**	April 29, 1894	University of California, Berkeley	Berkeley, California	Active	(Note: This chapter originated as Tau Delta (local) in 1893.)
**Theta**	December 28, 1897	University of Denver	Denver, Colorado	Active	(Note: This chapter originated as Alpha Iota (local) in 1891.)
**Iota**	November 16, 1901 – 1915; 2015	Columbia University	New York City, New York	Active	(Note: This chapter originated as Pi Pi Sigma (local) in 1900.)
**Kappa**	May 23, 1902	University of Minnesota	Minneapolis, Minnesota	Active	(Note: This chapter originated as the Kalailu Club (local) in 1901.)
**Lambda**	May 17, 1903	University of Washington	Seattle, Washington	Active	(Note: This chapter originated as the Alpha Club (local) in 1899.)
Mu	June 9, 1905 – 1944; 1991–1992	Stanford University	Palo Alto, California	Inactive	(Note: This chapter originated as Gamma Beta (local) in 1903.)
**Nu**	December 18, 1908	University of Oregon	Eugene, Oregon	Active	(Note: This chapter originated as Tau Pi (local) in 1904.)
**Xi**	February 3, 1910	University of Idaho	Moscow, Idaho	Active	(Note: This chapter originated as Alpha Delta Pi (local) in 1903. There was no connection with the later-formed women's fraternity of that same name, as this local chapter pre-dated their origination by two years.)
**Omicron**	May 24, 1913	University of Illinois Urbana-Champaign	Urbana, Illinois	Active	(Note: This chapter originated as Phi Beta (local) in 1907.)
**Pi**	June 22, 1914	University of Nebraska–Lincoln	Lincoln, Nebraska	Active	(Note: This chapter originated as Phi Beta (local) in 1913.)
**Rho**	June 15, 1915	University of Iowa	Iowa City, Iowa	Active	(Note: This chapter originated as Sigma Rho (local) in 1914.)
**Sigma**	October 9, 1915	University of Kansas	Lawrence, Kansas	Active	(Note: This chapter originated as the Crescent Club (local) earlier in 1915.)
**Tau**	October 16, 1915	Colorado State University	Fort Collins, Colorado	Active	(Note: This chapter originated as Tau Kappa Sigma (local) in 1905.)
Upsilon	June 1, 1916 – 1929	Hollins College	Hollins, Virginia	Inactive	(Note: This chapter originated as the Alpha chapter of Phi Mu Gamma in 1898.)
**Phi**	February 23, 1917 – 1993; 2016	Washington University in St. Louis	St. Louis, Missouri	Active	(Note: This chapter originated as Tau Upsilon (local) in 1915.)
Chi	April 26, 1918 – 2002	Oregon State University	Corvallis, Oregon	Inactive	(Note: This chapter originated as Beta Tau Beta (local) in 1915.)
**Psi**	September 13, 1918	University of Oklahoma	Norman, Oklahoma	Active	(Note: This chapter originated as Kappa Lambda (local) in 1917.)
**Omega**	December 21, 1918	Iowa State University	Ames, Iowa	Active	(Note: This chapter originated as Zeta Iota (local) in 1914.)
**Alpha Alpha**	October 30, 1919	University of Toronto	Toronto, Ontario, Canada	Active	
**Alpha Beta**	June 16, 1920	University of North Dakota	Grand Forks, North Dakota	Active	
Alpha Gamma	May 14, 1921 – 2000	University of Nevada, Reno	Reno, Nevada	Inactive	
**Alpha Delta**	May 20, 1921	University of Missouri	Columbia, Missouri	Active	
**Alpha Epsilon**	April 29, 1922	University of Arizona	Tucson, Arizona	Active	
Alpha Zeta	May 29, 1922 – 1988	University of Texas at Austin	Austin, Texas	Inactive	
Alpha Eta	November 10, 1923 – 1984	Ohio Wesleyan University	Delaware, Ohio	Inactive	
Alpha Theta	June 25, 1924 – 1998	Vanderbilt University	Nashville, Tennessee	Inactive	
**Alpha Iota**	June 26, 1924 – 1995; 2000	University of California, Los Angeles	Los Angeles, California	Active	
Alpha Kappa	June 5, 1925 – 1975	University of Manitoba	Winnipeg, Manitoba, Canada	Inactive	
**Alpha Lambda**	April 28, 1928	University of British Columbia	Vancouver, British Columbia, Canada	Active	
Alpha Mu	June 9, 1928 – 1971	Rollins College	Winter Park, Florida	Inactive	
**Alpha Nu**	June 8, 1929	Wittenberg University	Springfield, Ohio	Active	
**Alpha Xi**	September 21, 1929 – 2023	Southern Methodist University	Dallas, Texas	Inactive	
Alpha Omicron	February 1, 1930 – 1993	North Dakota State University	Fargo, North Dakota	Inactive	
Alpha Pi	April 18, 1930 – 1938; 1959–1984	West Virginia University	Morgantown, West Virginia	Inactive	
Alpha Rho	September 6, 1930 – 1957	Birmingham–Southern College	Birmingham, Alabama	Inactive	
Alpha Sigma	September 13, 1930 – 1951	Randolph-Macon Woman's College	Lynchburg, Virginia	Inactive	(Note: This chapter originated as Delta Sigma Upsilon (local), formed in 1929.) (Note: This school, originally Randolph-Macon Women's College, changed its name to Randolph College in 2007.)
**Alpha Tau**	September 26, 1931	McGill University	Montreal, Quebec, Canada	Active	
**Alpha Upsilon**	May 21, 1932	Pennsylvania State University	State College, Pennsylvania	Active	
Alpha Phi	October 15, 1932 – 1995	Colorado College	Colorado Springs, Colorado	Inactive	
**Alpha Chi**	January 14, 1933	College of William & Mary	Williamsburg, Virginia	Active	
Alpha Psi	May 19, 1934 – 1961	Lake Forest College	Lake Forest, Illinois	Inactive	
Alpha Omega	October 24, 1936 – 2004	University of Western Ontario	London, Ontario, Canada	Inactive	
**Beta Alpha**	September 24, 1938	University of Southern California	Los Angeles, California	Active	
**Beta Beta**	June 22, 1940 – 2000; 2016	University of Maryland, College Park	College Park, Maryland	Active	
Beta Gamma	October 23, 1943 – 2015	Bowling Green State University	Bowling Green, Ohio	Inactive	
**Beta Delta**	June 3, 1944	Michigan State University	East Lansing, Michigan	Active	
**Beta Epsilon**	April 12, 1947	Miami University	Oxford, Ohio	Active	
Beta Zeta	October 25, 1947 – 1972	Kent State University	Kent, Ohio	Inactive	
**Beta Eta**	April 3, 1948	Bradley University	Peoria, Illinois	Active	
Beta Theta	April 24, 1948 – 1984	San Jose State University	San Jose, California	Inactive	
**Beta Lambda**	October 15, 1949	San Diego State University	San Diego, California	Active	
Beta Iota	October 22, 1949 – 1985	Idaho State University	Pocatello, Idaho	Inactive	
Beta Kappa	December 3, 1949 – 1987; 1990–2014	Arizona State University	Tempe, Arizona	Inactive	
**Beta Mu**	April 29, 1950	Florida State University	Tallahassee, Florida	Active	
Beta Nu	September 16, 1950 – 1974	University of Vermont	Burlington, Vermont	Inactive	
**Beta Xi**	April 28, 1951 – 1967; 2014	Ohio State University	Columbus, Ohio	Active	
**Beta Omicron**	November 3, 1951	Oklahoma City University	Oklahoma City, Oklahoma	Active	
**Beta Pi**	September 14, 1952	Indiana State University	Terre Haute, Indiana	Active	
**Beta Rho**	March 14, 1954	University of Colorado Boulder	Boulder, Colorado	Active	
**Beta Sigma**	March 5, 1955	Washington State University	Pullman, Washington	Active	
Beta Tau	March 10, 1956 – 1986; 1989–2001	Texas Tech University	Lubbock, Texas	Inactive	
**Beta Upsilon**	March 23, 1957	Kansas State University	Manhattan, Kansas	Active	
**Beta Phi**	November 16, 1957	Indiana University Bloomington	Bloomington, Indiana	Active	
**Beta Chi**	February 1, 1958	Wichita State University	Wichita, Kansas	Active	
**Beta Psi**	February 8, 1958	Oklahoma State University	Stillwater, Oklahoma	Active	
**Beta Omega**	February 15, 1958	Northern Arizona University	Flagstaff, Arizona	Active	
Gamma Alpha	March 15, 1958 – 1984	Memphis State University	Memphis, Tennessee	Inactive	
**Gamma Beta**	February 21, 1959	Gettysburg College	Gettysburg, Pennsylvania	Active	
**Gamma Gamma**	March 19, 1960	University of Wisconsin–Milwaukee	Milwaukee, Wisconsin	Active	
Gamma Delta	April 15, 1961 – 1973	University of Wyoming	Laramie, Wyoming	Inactive	
**Gamma Epsilon**	April 29, 1961	University of Puget Sound	Tacoma, Washington	Active	
**Gamma Zeta**	March 3, 1962	East Texas A&M University	Commerce, Texas	Active	(Note: Texas A&M University at Commerce changed its name to East Texas A&M University on 7 November 2024.)
**Gamma Eta**	March 10, 1962	California State University, Long Beach	Long Beach, California	Active	
Gamma Theta	February 9, 1963 – 1972	University of the Pacific	Stockton, California	Inactive	
**Gamma Iota**	March 16, 1963	Midwestern State University	Wichita Falls, Texas	Active	
**Gamma Kappa**	May 11, 1963	University of Nebraska at Kearney	Kearney, Nebraska	Active	
Gamma Lambda	March 14, 1964 – 1977	Louisiana State University	Baton Rouge, Louisiana	Inactive	
Gamma Mu	April 26, 1964 – 2022	Minnesota State University Moorhead	Moorhead, Minnesota	Inactive	
Gamma Nu	February 20, 1965 – 1993	Lamar University	Beaumont, Texas	Inactive	
Gamma Xi	May 15, 1965 – 1977	University of Tennessee	Knoxville, Tennessee	Inactive	
**Gamma Omicron**	January 22, 1966 – 1982; 2019	University of Kentucky	Lexington, Kentucky	Active	
**Gamma Pi**	February 5, 1966	Minnesota State University, Mankato	Mankato, Minnesota	Active	
**Gamma Rho**	May 14, 1966 – 1976; 1985	University of Wisconsin–Oshkosh	Oshkosh, Wisconsin	Active	
**Gamma Tau**	November 11, 1967	Saint Louis University	St. Louis, Missouri	Active	
Gamma Sigma	January 13, 1968 – 1976	Western Michigan University	Kalamazoo, Michigan	Inactive	
Gamma Upsilon	February 1, 1968 – 1983	Drake University	Des Moines, Iowa	Inactive	
**Gamma Chi**	February 3, 1968 – 1991; 2012	Texas State University	San Marcos, Texas	Active	
**Gamma Phi**	May 4, 1968 – 1983; 1996	Auburn University	Auburn, Alabama	Active	
**Gamma Psi**	November 23, 1968	University of Northern Iowa	Cedar Falls, Iowa	Active	
**Gamma Omega**	March 29, 1969	University of Wisconsin–Platteville	Platteville, Wisconsin	Active	
Delta Alpha	May 3, 1969 – 1984	University of Wisconsin–River Falls	River Falls, Wisconsin	Inactive	
Delta Beta	February 21, 1970 – 1991	Boise State University	Boise, Idaho	Inactive	
Delta Gamma	March 7, 1970 – 1976	University of Nebraska Omaha	Omaha, Nebraska	Inactive	
**Delta Delta**	April 3, 1971	California State University, Fullerton	Fullerton, California	Active	
Delta Epsilon	April 28, 1973 – 2013	Texas Wesleyan University	Fort Worth, Texas	Inactive	
Delta Zeta	May 5, 1973 – 1989	Southwestern Oklahoma State University	Sayre, Oklahoma	Inactive	
**Delta Eta**	January 19, 1974	University of California, Irvine	Irvine, California	Active	
**Delta Theta**	January 18, 1975	California Polytechnic State University, San Luis Obispo	San Luis Obispo, California	Active	
**Delta Iota**	April 19, 1975	Purdue University	West Lafayette, Indiana	Active	
**Delta Lambda**	January 24, 1976	University of California, Riverside	Riverside, California	Active	
**Delta Kappa**	January 31, 1976	Lehigh University	Bethlehem, Pennsylvania	Active	
**Delta Mu**	April 23, 1977	Rutgers University	New Brunswick, New Jersey	Active	
Delta Nu	November 12, 1977 – 1994; 2009	Missouri State University	Springfield, Missouri	Inactive	
Delta Xi	December 2, 1978 – 1990	Bucknell University	Lewisburg, Pennsylvania	Inactive	(Note: This chapter originated as Delta Beta Phi (local), formed in 1974.)
Delta Omicron	January 26, 1980 – 2015	Southern Polytechnic State University	Marietta, Georgia	Consolidated	(Note: On July 1, 2015, Southern Polytechnic State University was merged with Kennesaw State University, with Kennesaw becoming the surviving institution. Its engineering school was renamed in honor of the former SPSU. The two chapters, Delta Omicron and Zeta Omega, were consolidated at that time.)
**Delta Pi**	April 19, 1980	Illinois State University	Normal, Illinois	Active	
Delta Rho	May 17, 1980 – 1987	Dickinson College	Carlisle, Pennsylvania	Inactive	
**Delta Sigma**	May 30, 1981	Florida Institute of Technology	Melbourne, Florida	Active	
**Delta Tau**	November 14, 1981	Colgate University	Hamilton, New York	Active	
**Delta Upsilon**	February 5, 1983	University of Georgia	Athens, Georgia	Active	
**Delta Phi**	April 23, 1983	California State University, Bakersfield	Bakersfield, California	Active	
**Delta Chi**	May 14, 1983	California State University, Sacramento	Sacramento, California	Active	
**Delta Psi**	November 19, 1983	University of California, Santa Barbara	Santa Barbara, California	Active	
**Epsilon Alpha**	December 10, 1983	La Salle University	Philadelphia, Pennsylvania	Active	
**Delta Omega**	April 7, 1984	Oakland University	Rochester, Michigan	Active	
**Epsilon Beta**	September 22, 1984	Alma College	Alma, Michigan	Active	
**Epsilon Gamma**	October 27, 1984	University of San Diego	San Diego, California	Active	
**Epsilon Delta**	February 22, 1986	Creighton University	Omaha, Nebraska	Active	
**Epsilon Epsilon**	May 3, 1986	Union College	Schenectady, New York	Active	
**Epsilon Zeta**	November 21, 1987	Jacksonville University	Jacksonville, Florida	Active	
**Epsilon Eta**	November 22, 1987	Bridgewater State University	Bridgewater, Massachusetts	Active	
**Epsilon Theta**	April 9, 1988	Clemson University	Clemson, South Carolina	Active	
**Epsilon Iota**	April 30, 1988	Christopher Newport University	Newport News, Virginia	Active	
**Epsilon Kappa**	November 12, 1988	California State University, Chico	Chico, California	Active	
**Epsilon Lambda**	February 4, 1989	University of Alabama	Tuscaloosa, Alabama	Active	
**Epsilon Mu**	April 22, 1989	Loyola University New Orleans	New Orleans, Louisiana	Active	
**Epsilon Nu**	April 29, 1989	Chapman University	Orange, California	Active	
Epsilon Xi	October 28, 1989 – 1998	Rhodes College	Memphis, Tennessee	Inactive	
**Epsilon Omicron**	February 10, 1990	University of California, Santa Cruz	Santa Cruz, California	Active	
**Epsilon Pi**	April 28, 1990	George Mason University	Fairfax County, Virginia	Active	
Epsilon Rho	May 5, 1990 – 1994	Stephen F. Austin State University	Nacogdoches, Texas	Inactive	
**Epsilon Sigma**	January 19, 1991	Morehead State University	Morehead, Kentucky,	Active	
**Epsilon Tau**	February 2, 1991	University of Rochester	Rochester, New York	Active	
Epsilon Upsilon	April 27, 1991 – 1996	University of South Dakota	Vermillion, South Dakota	Inactive	
**Epsilon Phi**	December 8, 1991	Bentley University	Waltham, Massachusetts	Active	
Epsilon Chi	April 11, 1992 – 1994	Marquette University	Milwaukee, Wisconsin	Inactive	
**Epsilon Psi**	November 21, 1992	University of North Carolina at Asheville	Asheville, North Carolina	Active	
Epsilon Omega	April 17, 1993 – 1998	University of Miami	Coral Gables, Florida	Inactive	
**Zeta Alpha**	November 13, 1993	Eastern Washington University	Cheney, Washington	Active	
**Zeta Beta**	April 9, 1994	University of Virginia	Charlottesville, Virginia	Active	
**Zeta Gamma**	May 7, 1994	Sonoma State University	Rohnert Park, California	Active	
**Zeta Delta**	November 5, 1994	Southeast Missouri State University	Cape Girardeau, Missouri	Active	
**Zeta Epsilon**	November 11, 1995	Duquesne University	Pittsburgh, Pennsylvania	Active	
**Zeta Zeta**	April 12, 1996	Coastal Carolina University	Conway, South Carolina	Active	
**Zeta Eta**	April 13, 1996	Lander University	Greenwood, South Carolina	Active	
**Zeta Theta**	January 18, 1997	Pepperdine University	Malibu, California	Active	
**Zeta Iota**	April 18, 1998	Valparaiso University	Valparaiso, Indiana	Active	
**Zeta Kappa**	November 14, 1998	University of Southern Indiana	Evansville, Indiana	Active	
**Zeta Lambda**	November 14, 1998	Texas A&M University–Corpus Christi	Corpus Christi, Texas	Active	
**Zeta Mu**	January 22, 2000	St. John's University	Queens, New York	Active	
**Zeta Nu**	February 13, 2000	University of Detroit Mercy	Detroit, Michigan	Active	
Zeta Xi	May 13, 2000 – 202x ?	College of Idaho	Caldwell, Idaho	Inactive	(Note: This chapter originated as the Gamma Women's Group in 1999.) (Note: This college was briefly named Albertson College of Idaho, between 1991 and 2008. It had previously been named the College of Idaho, founded in 1891.)
**Zeta Omicron**	May 13, 2000	John Carroll University	University Heights, Ohio	Active	
Zeta Pi	March 29, 2003 – 2018	Penn State Altoona	Logan Township, Pennsylvania	Inactive	
**Zeta Rho**	February 21, 2004	Texas A&M University	College Station, Texas	Active	
**Zeta Sigma**	March 19, 2005	University of South Carolina	Columbia, South Carolina	Active	
**Zeta Tau**	April 8, 2006	Emory University	Atlanta, Georgia	Active	
Zeta Upsilon	April 22, 2006 – 2010	University of Texas at Tyler	Tyler, Texas	Inactive	
**Zeta Phi**	April 14, 2007	University of Arkansas–Fort Smith	Fort Smith, Arkansas	Active	
**Zeta Chi**	February 2, 2008	Texas Christian University	Fort Worth, Texas	Active	
**Zeta Psi**	April 5, 2008	University of Texas at San Antonio	San Antonio, Texas	Active	
**Zeta Omega**	April 26, 2008	Kennesaw State University	Kennesaw, Georgia	Active	
Eta Alpha	November 21, 2009 – 2017	Lake Erie College	Painesville, Ohio	Inactive	
**Eta Beta**	April 10, 2010	Florida Southern College	Lakeland, Florida	Active	
**Eta Gamma**	May 8, 2010	University of Delaware	Newark, Delaware	Active	
**Eta Delta**	December 4, 2010	Grand Valley State University	Allendale, Michigan	Active	
**Eta Epsilon**	April 30, 2011	Virginia Tech	Blacksburg, Virginia	Active	
**Eta Zeta**	February 4, 2012	University of Cincinnati	Cincinnati, Ohio	Active	
**Eta Eta**	November 17, 2012	University of South Florida	Tampa, Florida	Active	
**Eta Theta**	November 17, 2012	University of Connecticut	Storrs, Connecticut	Active	
**Eta Iota**	April 19, 2013	Rockhurst University	Kansas City, Missouri	Active	
Eta Kappa	November 2, 2013 – 20xx ?	University of Tennessee at Chattanooga	Chattanooga, Tennessee	Inactive	
**Eta Lambda**	November 16, 2013	University of Central Florida	Orlando, Florida	Active	
Eta Mu	April 6, 2014 – 2022	Duke University	Durham, North Carolina	Inactive	
**Eta Nu**	December 7, 2014	James Madison University	Harrisonburg, Virginia	Active	
**Eta Xi**	October 31, 2015	University of Florida	Gainesville, Florida	Active	
**Eta Omicron**	November 22, 2015	Ohio University	Athens, Ohio	Active	
**Eta Pi**	December 5, 2015	Quinnipiac University	Hamden, Connecticut	Active	
**Eta Rho**	April 23, 2016	University of Nevada, Las Vegas	Las Vegas, Nevada	Active	
**Eta Sigma**	November 13, 2016	University of Central Missouri	Warrensburg, Missouri	Active	
**Eta Tau**	November 19, 2016	Colorado Mesa University	Grand Junction, Colorado	Active	
**Eta Upsilon**	April 8, 2017	Nicholls State University	Thibodaux, Louisiana	Active	
**Eta Phi**	October 26, 2019	Virginia Commonwealth University	Richmond, Virginia	Active	
**Eta Chi**	September 10, 2020	California State University, San Marcos	San Marcos, California	Active	
