= Lambda Phi Delta =

American fine arts sorority (1917–1930)

- ΛΦΔ
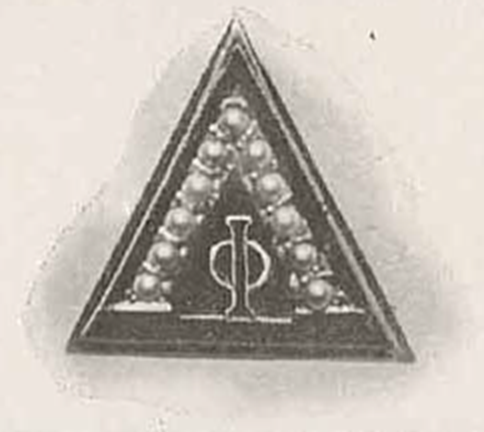
- Founded: March 1, 1917; 108 years ago Northwestern University
- Type: Professional
- Affiliation: Independent
- Status: Merged
- Emphasis: Fine arts
- Scope: National
- Colors: Blue, Gold, and Bronze
- Symbol: Sword
- Flower: Sweetheart rose and forget-me-not
- Jewel: Sapphire
- Publication: The Triangle
- Chapters: 6
- Headquarters: United States

Lambda Phi Delta (ΛΦΔ) was an American professional fine arts sorority. It was established at Northwestern University in Evanston, Illinois in 1917. It established six chapters before merging with Phi Mu Gamma professional sorority in 1930.

== History ==
Lambda Phi Delta formed as the Senior Club at the Cumnock School of Oratory at Northwestern University in Evanston, Illinois in the spring of 1917. It became Lambda Phi Delta, a professional sorority for the fine arts, in the fall of 1917. The fine arts included music, expression, and dancing. Membership in the fraternity was open to women studying art, music, physical education or speech.

Lambda Phi Delta became a national sorority with created of a second chapter of the Kansas State Teachers College of Pittsburg in 1920. This was followed by chapters at the Horner Institute of Fine Arts and Kansas State Teachers' College in May 1921. Eventually, the sorority expanded to six chapters, all located in the Midwestern United States.

Lambda Phi Delta was governed by a grand council that was elected at biennial national conclaves. In January 1924 and 1925, its conclaves were held in Decatur, Illinois. Annually, its members celebrated Founders' Day on March 1. The sorority's philanthropic activities included sponsoring two scholarships: one in music and another in expression and dance. Members held concerts to fund the scholarships.

In June 1930, representatives of Lambda Phi Delta met with Phi Mu Gamma, a national oratory and drama sorority, to discuss a merger. Lambda Phi Delta's did not duplicate any of Phi Mu Gamma's chapters. The merger was approved at the fraternity's national conclave on September 16, 1930, in Omaha, Nebraska and became official on October 10, 1930. Because Phi Mu Gamma was the older of the two organizations, it was decided to use its name after the merger. All of Lambda Phi Delta's members and alumnae became members of Phi Mu Gamma.

== Symbols ==
Lambda Phi Delta badge was a gold triangle with beveled edges, topped by a black enamel Δ; inside the Δ was the Greek letter Λ made of pearls, and between the arms of the Λ was a raised letter Φ. It also had a recognition pin that was a small gold sword.

Its colors were blue, gold, and bronze. Its flowers were the sweetheart rose and the forget-me-not. Its jewel was the sapphire. The fraternity's publication was The Triangle.

== Chapters ==
Following are the chapters of Lambda Phi Delta, with inactive chapters and institutions in italics.

Chapters	Charter date and range	Institution	Location	Status	Ref.
Alpha	March 1, 1917 – October 10, 1930	Northwestern University School of Speech	Evanston, Illinois	Merged (ΦΜΓ)	(Note: Chapter was formed at the Cumnock School of Oratory at Northwestern University, later called the Northwestern University School of Speech.) (Note: Became a chapter of Phi Mu Gamma.)
Beta	April 27, 1920 – October 10, 1930	Kansas State Teachers College of Pittsburg	Pittsburg, Kansas	Merged (ΦΜΓ)	(Note: Chapter formed from Theta Kappa Phi, a local social sorority established in 1918.)
Gamma	May 23, 1921 – October 10, 1930	Kansas City–Horner Conservatory of Music	Kansas City, Kansas	Merged (ΦΜΓ)	(Note: Chapter formed at the Horner Institute for Fine Arts, which merged with the Kansas City Conservatory of Music and Arts on July 1, 1926.)
Delta	May 1921 – October 10, 1930	Kansas State Teachers' College	Emporia, Kansas	Merged (ΦΜΓ)	(Note: Chapter formed from Theta Chi Theta (local).)
Epsilon	192x ? – May 1930	Lombard College	Galesburg, Illinois	Inactive	(Note: The college closed after graduation in May 1930, and, therefore, only the alumnae of this chapter participated in the merger)
Zeta	May 30, 1923 – October 10, 1930	James Millikin University	Decatur, Illinois	Merged (ΦΜΓ)	
Eta	February 1924 – October 10, 1930	Chicago Musical College	Chicago, Illinois	Merged (ΦΜΓ)	
Theta	192x ? – October 10, 1930	Kansas City–Horner Conservatory of Music	Kansas City, Missouri	Merged (ΦΜΓ)	

== Notable members ==
Following are some of the notable members and honorary members of Lambda Phi Delta.

- Felix Borowski, composer
- Carl Busch, composer
- Charles F. Horner, Chautauqua promoter and founder of the Horner Institute of Fine Arts
- Ruth St. Denis, modern dancer
- Julia Marlowe, actress
- Edith Mason, opera singer
- Myrna Sharlow, opera singer
- Otis Skinner, stage actor

== See also ==
- Professional fraternities and sororities
