= Indiana State Teachers College =

Indiana State Teachers College may refer to former names of:

- Indiana University of Pennsylvania from 1927 to 1959
- Indiana State University from 1929 to 1965
