= Maurice Goldblatt =

American retailer (1889–1984)

- Born: Maurice Goldblatt; December 17, 1889; Staszów, Poland
- Died: July 17, 1984 (age 92); Chicago, Illinois
- Occupations: Art Gallery Director, Expert on Leonardo Da Vinci
- Known for: Co-founder of Goldblatt's
- Spouse: Bernice Goldblatt
- Children: 2
- Parent(s): Simon and Hannah Goldblatt

Maurice Goldblatt (December 17, 1889 – July 17, 1984) was the co-founder of the Goldblatt's department store.

== Biography ==
Goldblatt was born to a Jewish family in Staszów, the son of Simon Goldblatt and Hannah Diamond. His family immigrated to Chicago in 1905. In 1914, he and his brother Nathan opened a general merchandise store in a Polish neighborhood in Chicago located at Chicago Avenue and Ashland Avenue. Sales grew markedly from $15,000 in the first year to $1.4 million by 1915. As a discount store, the company did well through the Great Depression and by 1933 had $20 million in sales with seven stores (5 in Chicago, 1 in Joliet, Illinois, and 1 in Hammond, Indiana). At the end of World War II, the company had 15 stores and over 2,500 employees. In 1946, Maurice retired and handed control to his younger brothers, Louis and Joel. In the 1970s, Goldblatt's had $250 million in annual sales and 47 stores with over 8,000 employees in the Chicago area.

In 1981, the company filed for Chapter 11 reorganization. In 1985, it was bought by JG Industries Inc. and reduced to 15 Chicago-area stores. In 2003, the company filed for Chapter 7 liquidation.

== Personal life ==
In 1935, he married Bernice Goldblatt; they had two children, Stanford Goldblatt and Merle Goldblatt Cohen. Since his brother Nathan died of cancer in 1944, Maurice was a strong supporter of research to fight cancer. He was seminal in establishing the University of Chicago Cancer Research Foundation in 1947 and donated $3.4 million facility to the University of Chicago Medical Center.
