= Conservatory of Music of Kansas City =

Music and drama school in Missouri, US

Location
- 4420 Warwick Boulevard; Kansas City, Missouri; United States

Information
- Other names: Horner Institute–Kansas City Conservatory of Music; Kansas City–Horner Conservatory of Music
- Former names: Kansas City Conservatory of Music and Art (1906–1926); Horner Institute of Fine Arts (1914–1926)
- School type: Conservatory (music school, art school) private; later publicly owned
- Established: July 1, 1926 (100 years ago)
- Founder: Charles F. Horner
- Closed: September 1, 1959 (67 years ago)

The Conservatory of Music of Kansas City was a school of art, music, and drama in Kansas City, Missouri, United States. It was formed in 1926 through the merger of the Kansas City Conservatory of Music and Art and the Horner Institute of Fine Arts. In 1959, it became a part of the University of Kansas City, now the University of Missouri–Kansas City.

== History ==
=== Kansas City Conservatory of Music and Art ===
John A. Cowan established the Kansas City Conservatory of Music and Art on September 10, 1906. Cowan was previously the director of the Oratory and Elocution Department at Manual Training High School in St. Louis. In 1907, the school moved to a three-story building on the corner of Eleventh and Oak Streets.

In 1916, Cowan gave the conservatory to the city of Kansas City, Missouri. Thus, it became the first publicly owned music conservatory in the United States.

=== Horner Institute of Fine Arts ===
The Horner Institute of Fine Arts was opened by Charles F. Horner and Earl Rosenberg on September 7, 1914. Horner was a co-founder of the Redpath-Horner Chautauqua and the Lyceum Bureau, the largest promoter of musical programs, lectures, and plays in the United States. Horner was the institute's president. Rosenberg, a conductor and vocalist from Lindsborg, Kansas, was the institute's founding director.

The Horner Institute opened a rented building at 36th and Broadway in Kansas City, Missouri. When it opened, it had 250 students and twelve faculty members. Founding faculty included pianist Floyd Robbins and violist Forrest Schulz, also from Lindsborg. Initially, it trained musicians for Horner's Chautauqua programs, which were held in nine states and were headquartered in Kansas City. However, the institute eventually expanded the needs of the Chautauqua but still focused on training professional musicians. In the fall of 1920, the Horner Institute moved to a new 3,000-square-foot facility at 3000 Troost Avenue. At that time, the institute had 1,000 students. In 1923, it had 1,700 students and 37 faculty members.

=== Merger ===
On July 1, 1926, the Horner Institute absorbed the failing Kansas City Conservatory of Music and Art, forming the Horner Institute–Kansas City Conservatory of Music. After the merger, Horner remained the school's president. In 1928, it changed its name to the Kansas City–Horner Conservatory of Music.

In 1929, the school had 4,000 students and was the third-largest music school in the U.S. In 1934, the nonprofit school was reorganized as the Conservatory of Music of Kansas City.

On September 1, 1959, the conservatory merged with the University of Kansas City, a institution formed from Horner Junior College. It is now the University of Missouri–Kansas City Conservatory.

== Campus ==
It moved to a new location on 19 East Armour Avenue, finally moving to a three-acre site at 4420 Warwick Boulevard in August 1951. It also had a campus in Kansas City, Kansas. After a $250,000 construction project, the campus expanded to include Grant Hall and Russell Stover Memorial Auditorium in September 1955.

== Academics ==
The Kansas City Conservatory of Music taught music (flute, harp, organ, piano, reed instruments, violincello, vocal music, as well as ensemble playing, music composition, harmony, public-school music, sight reading); and art (china painting, drawing sketch work, oil painting, water color), and drama (dramatic art, elocution, oratory), and languages (French, Italian, Spanish).

The Horner Institute of Fine Arts offered Bachelor of Arts degrees and certificates in all branches of music and expression. The school provided instruction in music (harmony, music history, piano, voice, violin), art (pencil sketching, watercolor), and drama (dramatic art, language, public speaking).

== Student life ==
The institute had chapters of the Sigma Alpha Iota music fraternity for women, the Phi Mu Gamma professional-arts sorority, the Mu Phi Epsilon professional-music fraternity, the Lambda Phi Delta professional–fine-arts sorority, the Phi Mu Alpha Sinfonia music fraternity, and Zeta Alpha Chi.

== Notable people ==
Following are some of the notable people associated with the Kansas City Conservatory of Music and Arts, the Horner Institute of Fine Arts, and the Conservatory of Music of Kansas City.

=== Alumni ===
- Bob Brookmeyer, jazz musician, arranger, and composer
- William L. Dawson, composer
- Walter Greene, composer
- William Harms, classical pianist
- Virginia E. Johnson, sexologist and a member of the Masters and Johnson sexuality research team
- Betty Lynn, actress
- Inez Silberg, singer and voice teacher
- Ingrid Stölzel, composer of contemporary classical music
- Hazel Volkart, composer, music educator, and pianist
- Sandra Warfield, operatic mezzo-soprano

=== Faculty ===
- Moissaye Boguslawski, musical artist
- François Boucher, violinist and music educator
- Philip Farkas, musician
- Ellis Kohs, composer and scholar
- Henry Kramer, pianist
- Wiktor Łabuński, pianist and conductor
- Gardner Read, composer
- Arnold Volpe, composer and conductor
- Frank Waller, vocal coach and Olympic athlete
- Mary Watson Weaver, poet
