= Goldblatt's =

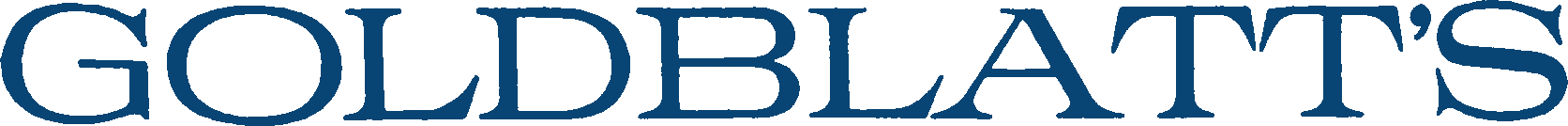
- Industry: Retail
- Founded: 1914
- Founder: Maurice Goldblatt; Nathan Goldblatt
- Defunct: 2003 (final liquidation; all stores closed by 2000)
- Fate: Liquidation
- Headquarters: Chicago, Illinois, U.S.
- Products: Clothing, footwear, bedding, furniture, jewelry, beauty products, electronics and housewares

Goldblatt's was an American chain of local discount stores that operated in Chicago, Illinois, as well as Indiana, Michigan and Wisconsin. Founded in 1914, the chain grew to more than twenty stores at its peak, gradually closing some stores in the 1990s and selling others to Ames before finally closing completely in 2000.

== History ==
=== Early beginnings ===
- Goldblatt Bros. Department Store
- U.S. National Register of Historic Places
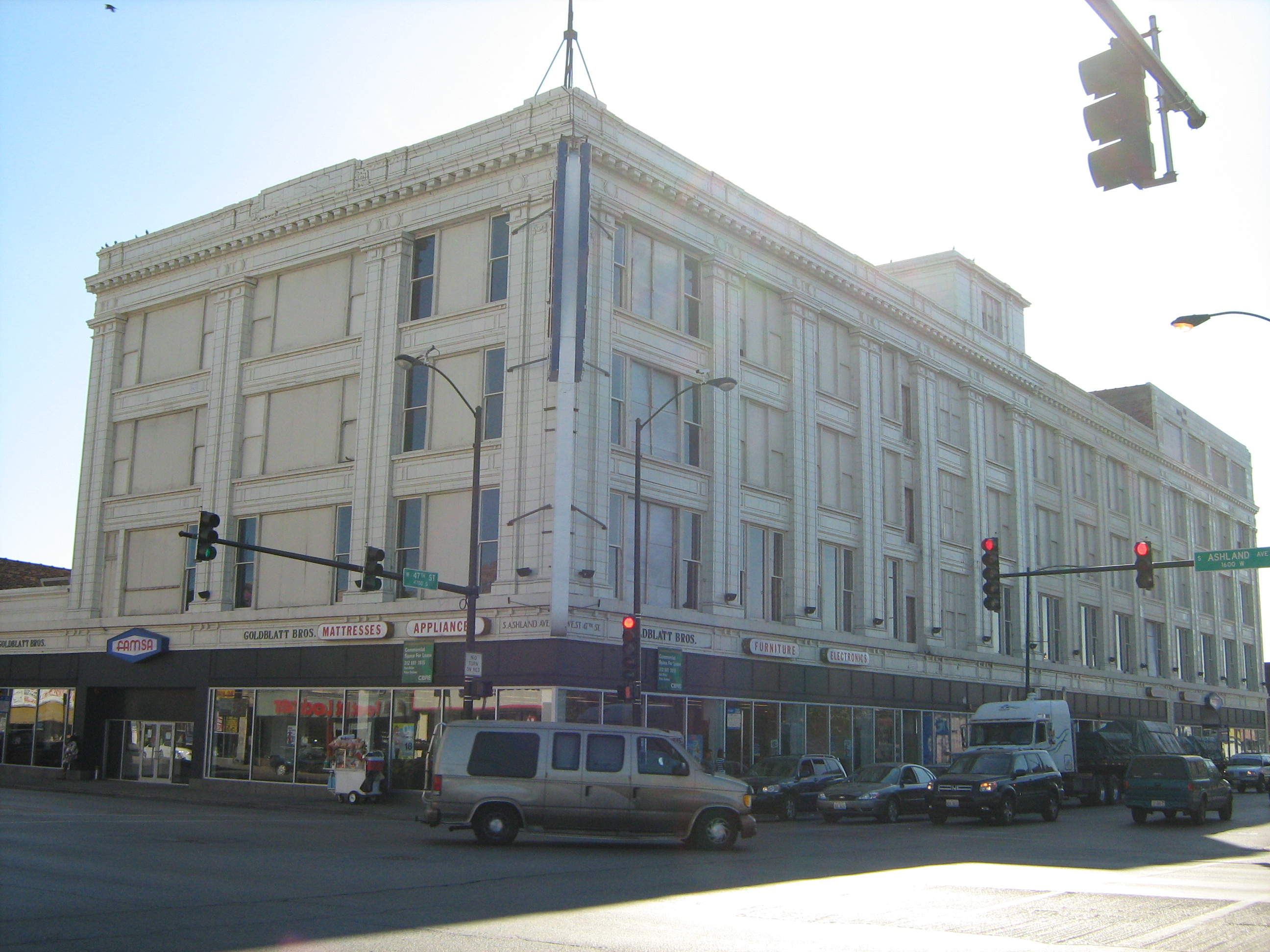

- Location within Chicago metropolitan area Location within Illinois Location within the United States
- Location: 4700 S. Ashland Ave., Chicago, Illinois
- Coordinates: 41°48′30″N 87°39′55″W
- Area: less than one acre
- Built: 1915
- Architect: Alfred S. Alschuler
- Architectural style: Chicago
- NRHP reference No.: 06001016
- Added to NRHP: November 15, 2006

Goldblatt's was founded in 1914 by brothers Nate and Maurice Goldblatt. Immigrants from Poland, the Goldblatt family ran a grocery store and butcher shop on Chicago's West Side. Nate and Maurice opened their first store near the corner of Ashland and Chicago Avenue. By 1922, the store recorded sales of over $800,000. By 1928 the brothers formed Goldblatt Brothers Inc. During the Great Depression of the 1930s Goldblatt's did well, and the brothers were able to purchase several smaller department stores.

In 1936, Goldblatt's opened its State Street flagship store at State and Van Buren. Goldblatt's moved towards more upscale products and offered small appliances, a delicatessen, and confectionery goods.

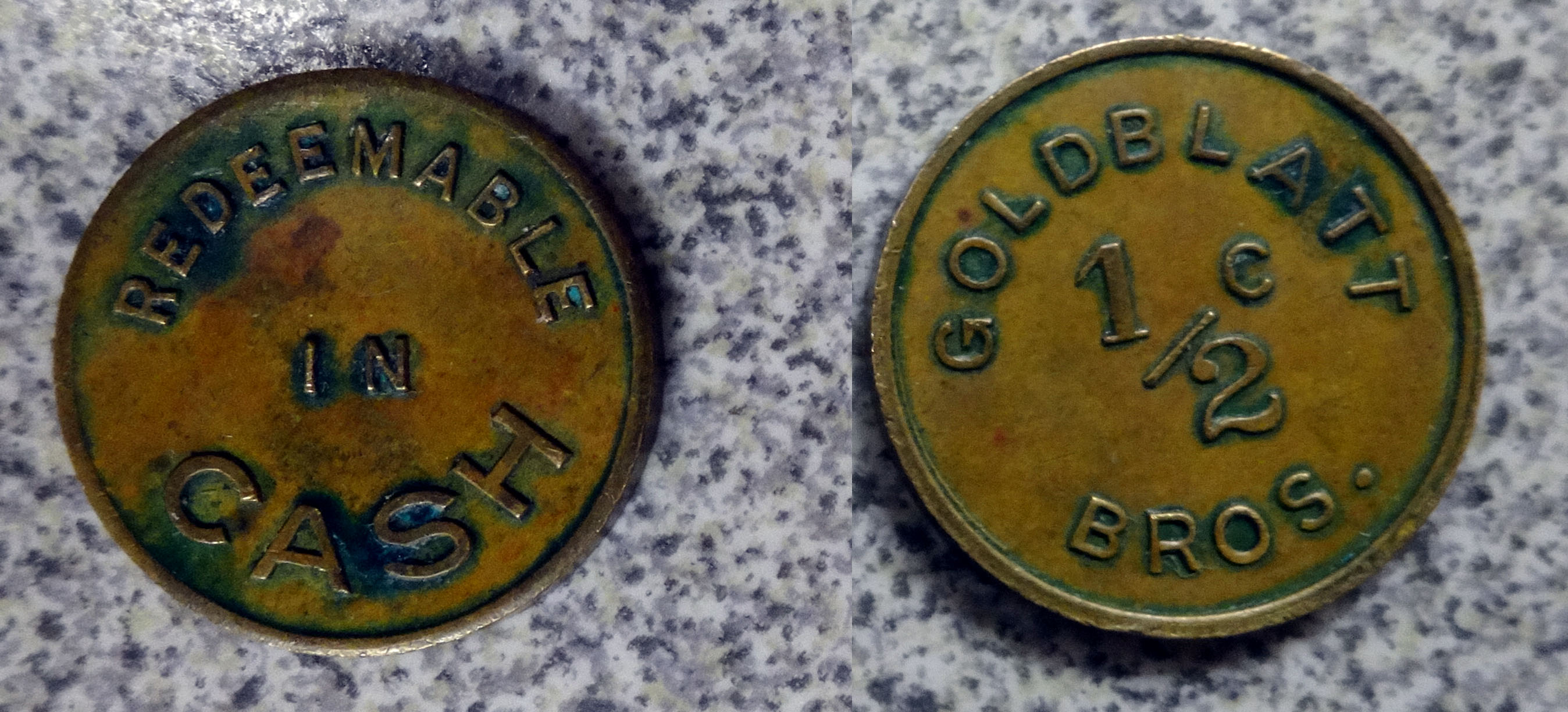
Goldblatt Department Stores 1/2 cent coin / token

=== Bankruptcy ===
By 1946 Goldblatt's was operating 15 stores with $62 million in annual sales. Things went well even as the Goldblatt brothers began to quarrel. In 1941, a one-store expansion into Buffalo, New York, was met with little success; the store closed on November 27, 1948, following a unionization attempt by the employees. By the 1950s growth began to stall, with profits flat-lining and new store openings averaging four a year.

By the mid-1960s, retailers such as Kmart, Woolco, Zayre, and Sears were digging into Goldblatt's market. Expansion into the suburbs proved to be a difficult obstacle for Goldblatt's. Middle class shoppers were not enticed to shop at Goldblatt's. The company declared bankruptcy in 1981.

In 1982, Goldblatt's reopened with six stores. The mission of the company was restored to selling to low income families. The flagship store, which was to be sold to City of Chicago under Mayor Jane Byrne for a public library location, later sold to DePaul University when the Harold Washington Library was built. Without the money from the City of Chicago Goldblatt's would have closed. Jerrold Wexler helped save the firm from bankruptcy. By 1985 Goldblatt's was profitable.

However, changing markets, increasing competition, and old stores doomed the chain. In 2000, Goldblatt's closed once again. Ames purchased several former stores to enter the Chicago market again (Ames had taken over many of Zayre's former Chicago stores, all of them later closed). But later in that same year, it returned and reopened its 47th and Ashland location. Goldblatt's later reclaimed four more locations when Ames closed its Chicago stores. In 2003, the company closed its stores for good and liquidated.

=== Ames ===
Shortly after Goldblatt's closed its stores, discount retailer Ames purchased seven of the stores for $7.6 million in April 2000.
