= Phi Mu Gamma =

American junior college sorority (1898–1921)

- ΦΜΓ
- Phi Mu Gamma member's badge
- Founded: October 17, 1898; 127 years ago Hollins Institute
- Type: Social
- Former affiliation: General Federation of Women's Clubs; NJCP
- Status: Defunct
- Defunct date: 1921
- Emphasis: Two-year colleges
- Scope: National
- Motto: "Know Thyself!"
- Colors: Turquoise blue and Black
- Symbol: Skull and crossbones
- Flower: Forget-me-not
- Jewel: Pearl and turquoise
- Patron Roman deity: Diana
- Publication: The Shield and Argaliad
- Chapters: 20+
- Headquarters: United States

Phi Mu Gamma (ΦΜΓ) was an American collegiate women's fraternity. It was established as a social sorority at the Hollins Institute (now Hollins University) in Virginia in 1898. In 1913, the fraternity limited its chapters to two-year institutions. Phi Mu Gamma went inactive in 1921.

== History ==
Phi Mu Gamma was founded as a social women's fraternity on October 17, 1898 at the Hollins Institute in Hollins, Virginia. Its purpose was "the uplift and advancement of womanhood". The founders were Maude Johnson, Elizabeth Cooley, Pearl S. Penn, Mona House, Daisy Bell Cooley, Louis Sykes and Elizabeth Leigh Wood. On March 22, 1902, Phi Mu Gamma Fraternity was incorporated in the Commonwealth of Virginia.

Phi Mu Gamma expanded to other colleges, establishing many chapters at junior colleges. Beta chapter was chartered at the Ely School for Girls in New York City in 1902, followed by Gamma at Brenau College and Delta at the Graham School in New York City in the same year. Brenau had a chapter house by 1907.

The fraternity held its first national convention at the Shoreham Hotel in Washington, D.C. in June 1907. The convention was attended by representatives from twelve chapters, including Hollins Institute, Brenau College, Jackson College, and two schools from New York. One of the delegates was Grace Bryan, daughter of William Jennings Bryan.

However, in July 1907, the fraternity only had five chapters, with sixty active members and 250 total initiates. The 1908 national convention was held in June at the Waldorf-Astoria in New York City. In 1909 year, Phi Mu Gamma was a member of the General Federation of Women's Clubs. In 1913, the sorority decided to limit its chapters to junior colleges. As a result, many of its chapters withdrew and joined other sororities.

By January 1921, Phi Mu Gamma was defunct. However, one month later, in February 1921, the Iota chapter at Emerson College of Oratory reestablished Phi Mu Gamma into a national oratory sorority.

== Symbols ==
Phi Mu Gamma's motto was "Know Thyself!". Its original insignia was a skull and crossbones. This was replaced with a shield bearing a crescent with a torch and the Roman numeral "XXVII". Its flag was an elongated turquoise triangle, bearing the Greek letters "ΦΜΓ" in black.

The fraternity's badge was a stacked shield, with the largest in gold and surrounded in pearls and turquoise, topped by a black enamel shield and, then, a gold shield with the Greek letters "ΦΜΓ" in black enamel. Its pledge pin was a gold bar with the Greek letters "ΦΜΓ" in black enamel.

The sorority's colors were turquoise and black. Its flower was the forget-me-not. Its jewels were turquoise and pearl. Its patron deity was Diana.

The fraternity's cheer was:

Raw bones! Saw bones!

Skull and crossbones!

Sis, boom, bah!

Phi Mu Gamma, rah, rah, rah!

Its magazine was The Shield, started in 1907. Its annual publication was the Argaliad, started in 1911.

== Activities ==
Some of the fraternity's charitable activities supported scholarships. The Eta chapter at the New England Conservatory of Music held an annual bazaar and dance to raise scholarship funds for the conservatory. The Iota chapter at Emerson College awarded a scholarship to the student with the highest record during their senior year. Gamma chapter at Brenau provided a scholarship that was open to the state of Georgia through the Women's Club of Atlanta.

== Chapters ==
=== Collegiate chapters ===
The number and order of all of Phi Mu Gamma's chapters are not known. Following is a list of known chapters, with inactive institutions indicated in italics.

Chapter	Charter date and range	Institution	Location	Status	Ref.
Alpha	1898–1916	Hollins College	Hollins, Virginia	Withdrew (ΓΦΒ)	(Note: Became the Upsilon chapter of Gamma Phi Beta.)
Beta	1902–1906	Ely School for Girls	New York City, New York	Inactive	(Note: The school moved to Greenwich, Connecticut, in 1907. The school was destroyed by a fire in 1926.)
Gamma	1902–1914	Brenau College	Gainesville, Georgia	Withdrew (local, then ΔΔΔ)	(Note: The chapter withdrew and merged with the Nu chapter of Beta Sigma Omicron to form Phi Beta (local). In 1915, it became the Alpha Epsilon chapter of Delta Delta Delta.)
Delta	1902–190x ?	Graham School	New York City, New York	Inactive	
Epsilon (First) ?	19xx ?–19xx?	Jackson Agricultural College	Jackson, Alabama	Inactive	(Note: The institution dropped its college division in 1903, becoming the First District Agricultural School.)
Zeta	1902–19xx ?	Veltin School for Girls	Manhattan, New York	Inactive	
Eta (First)				Inactive	
Theta	1904–1913	Judson College	Marion, Alabama	Withdrew (ΔΔΔ)	(Note: Became the Delta Theta chapter of Delta Delta Delta.)
Iota	1907–January 1921	Emerson College of Oratory	Boston, Massachusetts	Withdrew (local)	(Note: Chapter formed from Alpha Tau Delta (local), established in 1902. A month after the national fraternity ceased operations, this chapter reestablished the sorority as Phi Mu Gamma (professional) oratory sorority and expanded into a national group.)
Epsilon (Second)	1908–1909	Pleasant J. Potter College	Bowling Green, Kentucky	Inactive	
	1908–1910	Louisiana State University	Baton Rouge, Louisiana	Inactive	
Eta (Second)	1908–1915	New England Conservatory of Music	Boston, Massachusetts	Withdrew (ΣΑΙ)	(Note: Became the Lambda chapter of Sigma Alpha Iota.)
Kappa	January 1910–19xx ?	Centenary Female College	Cleveland, Tennessee	Inactive	(Note: Chapter formed from Sigma Chi. The college closed in 1929.)
Lambda	1910–1912	Shorter College	Rome, Georgia	Inactive	
Mu	1910 – May 16, 1914	H. Sophie Newcomb Memorial College	New Orleans, Louisiana	Withdrew (ΚΑΘ)	(Note: Became the Alpha Phi chapter of Kappa Alpha Theta.)
Nu	1911–1913	Alabama Women’s College (now Huntingdon College)	Montgomery, Alabama	Inactive	
	191x ?–191x ?	Caldwell College	Danville, Kentucky	Inactive	(Note: Caldwell College became the Kentucky College for Women in 1913.)
Xi	1914–1915	Ward–Belmont College	Nashville, Tennessee	Inactive	
Omicron	April 1913 – 1915	Christian College	Columbia, Missouri	Inactive	(Note: Chapter formed from Phi Mu Epsilon (local), established in 1912. It went inactive after the spring 1915 semester due to the college's anti-fraternity policies.)
Pi	1913 – 1916	Richmond Woman’s College	Richmond, Virginia	Inactive	(Note: Chapter went inactive when the college closed)
Rho	May 21, 1914 – November 1916	Middlebury College	Middlebury, Vermont	Withdrew (ΔΔΔ)	(Note: Chapter withdrew and became the Alpha Iota chapter of Delta Delta Delta.)

=== Alumnae chapters ===
An alumnae chapter was established in Birmingham, Alabama in September 1909. The Ocala Alumni chapter was established in Ocala, Florida in January 1910. There was also an Atlanta Alumnae chapter and a Norfolk and Portsmouth Alumnae chapter.

== See also ==
- College fraternities and sororities
- List of social sororities and women's fraternities
