= List of Sigma Iota Chi chapters =

Sigma Iota Chi was a national junior college sorority in the United States. It was established as a literary sorority in 1903 and installed at least seventy chapters at secondary schools and colleges. The sorority also had alumnae associations.

== Collegiate chapters ==
Following are the collegiate chapters of Sigma Iota Chi, with inactive institutions in italics.

| Chapter | Charter date and range | Institution | Location | Status | Ref. |
|---|---|---|---|---|---|
| Alpha | December 15, 1903 – 19xx ? (before 1921) | St. James & St. Xavier Academy | Alexandria, Louisiana | Inactive | |
| Beta | 1904–1907 | Winchester Normal College | Winchester, Tennessee | Inactive | (Note: Winchester Normal College gave its property to the public school system and became Center High School by 1911.) |
| Gamma (First) | 1905–1914 | Ward–Belmont College | Nashville, Tennessee | Inactive | (Note: The chapter was formed at the Ward Seminary for Young Ladies, which merged with Belmont College for Young Women in 1913 to form Ward-Belmont College.) |
| Delta (First) | 1905–1915 | Cincinnati Conservatory of Music | Cincinnati, Ohio | Withdrew (ΜΦΕ) | (Note: Became a chapter of Mu Phi Epsilon.) |
| Epsilon (First) | 1905–1907 | Hanna Moore Academy | Reisterstown, Maryland | Inactive | |
| Zeta (First) (see Gamma First) | 1905–1913 | Belmont College for Young Women | Nashville, Tennessee | Consolidated | (Note: Chapter closed when he institution merged with Ward Seminary for Young Ladies to form Ward-Belmont College.) |
| Eta (First | 1907–1909 | National Cathedral Academy | Washington, D.C. | Inactive | |
| Theta (First) | 1907–1909 | Pleasant J. Potter College | Bowling Green, Kentucky | Inactive | (Note: Chapter formed from Mu Phi Psi (local). The chapter went inactive when Potter College closed.) |
| Iota (First) | 1907–1910 | Virginia College | Roanoke, Virginia | Inactive | |
| Kappa (First) | 1907–1911 | Campbell–Hagerman College | Lexington, Kentucky | Inactive | (Note: The college closed in 1912.) |
| Lambda (First) | 1908–1911 | Gunston Hall School | Washington, D.C. | Inactive | |
| Mu (First) | 1909–between 1918 and 1921 | Crescent College and Conservatory | Eureka Springs, Arkansas | Inactive | (Note: The institution closed in 1924, and reopened in 1930 as a junior college. The junior college closed in 1934,) |
| Theta (Second) | 1909–1920 | Lindenwood College | St. Charles, Missouri | Inactive | (Note: Chapter formed from Sigma Theta (local).) |
| Nu (First) | 1910–1914 | Brenau College | Gainesville, Georgia | Inactive | (Note: Chapter formed from Kappa Alpha Phi (local).) |
| Xi (First) | 1910–1912 | Shorter College | Rome, Georgia | Inactive | |
| Eta (Second) | 1911–1938 | Stephens College | Columbia, Missouri | Withdrew (local) | (Note: Chapter formed from Phi Theta Phi, established in 1901. It became Sigma Alpha Chi (local).) |
| Omicron | 1914–1931 | Hardin College | Mexico, Missouri | Inactive | (Note: The chapter went inactive when the college closed in 1931) |
| Zeta (Second) | 1916–1932 | Belhaven College | Jackson, Mississippi | Inactive | |
| Kappa (Second) | 1918–1937 | Greenville Woman's College | Greenville, South Carolina | Inactive | (Note: The institution was absorbed by Furman University in 1938.) |
| Nu (Second) | 191x ?–after 1933 | American School of Physical Education | Chicago, Illinois | Inactive | (Note: The institution was absorbed by DePaul University in 1946.) |
| Pi (First) | 1925–1928 | Fulton Synodical College | Fulton, Mississippi | Inactive | (Note: Chapter closed when the institution closed in 1928.) |
| Rho | 192x ?–1931 | Hamilton College | Lexington, Kentucky | Inactive | (Note: The institution closed in 1932.) |
| Sigma (First) | before 1918–before 1921 | Grenada College | Grenada, Mississippi | Inactive | |
| Iota (Second) | 192x ?–before 1921 | Savage School of Physical Education | New York City, New York | Inactive | |
| Tau (First) | 191x ?–1925 | Central College For Women | Lexington, Missouri | Inactive | (Note: The chapter went inactive when the institution closed in 1925.) |
| Delta (Second) | November 1922–192x ? | Battle Creek Sanitarium School of Health and Home Economics | Battle Creek, Michigan | Inactive | (Note: Battle Creek Sanitarium School of Health and Home Economics became part of Battle Creek College in 1923. The college closed in 1938.) |
| Gamma (Second) | 1923–1931 | Logan College | Russellville, Kentucky | Inactive | (Note: The chapter went inactive when the college closed.) |
| Upsilon | February 1927 – 1968 | West Virginia University Institute of Technology | Montgomery, West Virginia | Withdrew (ΣΣΣ) | (Note: Chapter formed at New River State College, later called the West Virginia University Institute of Technology.) (Note: Chapter withdrew and became the Gamma Tau chapter of Sigma Sigma Sigma in 1968.) |
| Phi | May 22, 1929 – 197x ? | East Texas Baptist College | Marshall, Texas | Inactive | (Note: Chapter formed from Tri Lambda at the College of Marshall, later called the East Texas Baptist College.) |
| Chi | May 9, 1924 – 1933 | Howard College (now Samford University) | Birmingham, Alabama | Withdrew (ΒΣΟ) | (Note: Chapter withdrew and became the Beta Beta chapter of Beta Sigma Omicron, which later merged nationally with Zeta Tau Alpha.) |
| Epsilon (Second) | September 1925 – 1927 | Hedding College | Abington, Illinois | Inactive | (Note: The college closed in 1927.) |
| Psi | 1927–1933 | Crane Junior College | Chicago, Illinois | Inactive | (Note: The chapter went inactive when the institution closed in 1933.) |
| Omega | 192x ?–19xx ? | Millersburg College | Millerburg, Kentucky | Inactive | (Note: The institution closed in 1931.) |
| Epsilon (Third) | 192x ?–1975 | Potomac State College | Keyser, West Virginia | Inactive | |
| Lambda (Second) | February 1927–19xx ? | Greenbrier College | Lewisburg, West Virginia | Inactive | (Note: The college closed in 1972) |
| | before 1928–192x ? | Eastern College | Manassas, Virginia | Inactive | (Note: The college closed in the early 1920s.) |
| Mu (Second) | 1928–1943 | Blackstone College | Blackstone, Virginia | Inactive | (Note: The chapter went inactive when the college closed in 1943.) |
| Pi | 1929–1967 | Rider College | Trenton, New Jersey | Withdrew (ΑΞΔ) | (Note: Chapter withdrew and became the Epsilon Lamba chapter of Alpha Xi Delta in 1967.) |
| Sigma Delta | 1929–1936 | Louisburg College | Louisburg, North Carolina | Inactive | (Note: Chapter formed from Sigma Delta Theta, established in 1923.) |
| Xi (Second) | 19xx ?–19xx ? | Highland Manor School and Junior College | Tarrytown, New York | Inactive | (Note: Highland Manor School for Girls moved to West Long Branch, New Jersey, in 1942.) |
| Delta (Third) | 1928–19xx ? | Vincennes University | Vincennes, Indiana | Inactive | |
| Tau (Second) | 1928–19xx ? | Northeastern Oklahoma A&M College | Miami, Oklahoma | Inactive | (Note: Chapter formed from The Seven Eleven Club, established in 1925 at Northeastern Oklahoma Junior College, which became Northeastern Oklahoma A&M College in 1943.) |
| Theta (Third) | 19xx ?–193x ? | Mississippi Synodical College | Holly Springs, Mississippi | Inactive | (Note: The institution closed in 1939.) |
| Beta Alpha | 1929–19xx ? | San Benito Junior College | Hollister, California | Inactive | |
| Beta Beta (Second ?) | 19xx ?–19xx ? | Damon Hall School | Massachusetts | Inactive | |
| Beta Beta (First ?) | September 23, 1929 –19xx ? | Dodd College | Shreveport, Louisiana | Inactive | (Note: Chapter formed from Theta Alpha Phi. The college closed in 1942.) |
| Beta Gamma | 19xx ?–19xx ? | Cumnock Junior College | Los Angeles, California | Inactive | (Note: Cumnock closed in 1947.) |
| Beta Delta (First) | 1930–1946 | Amarillo College | Amarillo, Texas | Withdrew (local) | (Note: Chapter withdrew and became the local sorority Sigma Phi Chi.) |
| Beta Epsilon | 1931–193x ? | Wayland Baptist College | Plainview, Texas | Inactive | |
| Beta Zeta | May 1931 – 1946 | Holmby College (aka Westlake Junior College) | Holmby Hills, Los Angeles, California | Inactive | (Note: Chapter formed from Delta Psi Omega Society, established in 1927. It went inactive when the junior college closed in 1946.) |
| Beta Eta | 1931–19xx ? | Sacramento Junior College | Sacramento, California | Inactive | |
| Beta Theta | 1932–1963 | Bryant University | Smithfield, Rhode Island | Withdrew (local) | (Note: The chapter withdrew in 1963 and became Sigma Iota Xi, a local sorority that operated until 1986.) |
| Beta Iota | 1932–1961 | Tennessee Wesleyan College | Athens, Tennessee | Withdrew (ΣΚ) | (Note: The chapter formed from Gamma Gamma, established in 1927. The chapter withdrew and became the Gamma Psi chapter of Sigma Kappa .) |
| Beta Kappa (First) | 193x ?–19xx ? | Springfield Junior College | Springfield, Illinois | Inactive | |
| Beta Lambda | 193x ?–1969 | Woodbury College | Burbank, California | Withdrew (ΑΞΔ) | (Note: Chapter withdrew and became the Epsilon Upsilon chapter of Alpha Xi Delta.) |
| Beta Mu (First) | 193x ?–19xx ? | Portia Law School | Boston, Massachusetts | Inactive | |
| Sigma (Second) | 1933–1947 | Posse-Nissen School of Physical Education | Boston, Massachusetts | Inactive | (Note: After going inactive, the chapter was reformed from Sigma Epsilon Chi, established in 1922.) |
| Beta Nu | 1936–1965 | University of Charleston | Charleston, West Virginia | Withdrew (ΑΞΔ) | (Note: Chapter withdrew and became the Delta Phi chapter of Alpha Xi Delta in 1965.) |
| Beta Xi (First) | 1936–1948 | Eastern New Mexico State College | Portales, New Mexico | Withdrew (local) | (Note: The chapter formed at Eastern New Mexico Junior College, which became Eastern New Mexico State College in 1940 and Eastern New Mexico University in 1955. The chapter withdrew and became Sigma Beta Chi (local), which joined Chi Omega in 1962.) |
| Beta Delta (Second) | 1965–1977 | University of Toledo | Toledo, Ohio | Inactive | |
| Beta Kappa (Second) | 1965–197x ? | Youngstown State University | Youngstown, Ohio | Inactive | (Note: Chapter formed from Tau Kappa Nu, established in 1939.) |
| Beta Xi (Second) | 1966–1989 | Brandywine Junior College | Wilmington, Delaware | Withdrew (ΦΜ) | (Note: Chapter withdrew and joined Phi Mu. The institution was absorbed by Widener College in 1991.) |
| Beta Sigma | 196x ?–19xx ? | Armstrong College | Berkeley, California | Inactive | |
| Beta Mu (Second) | April 14, 1967 – 197x ? | Dixie College | St. George, Utah | Inactive | (Note: Chapter was formed from Phi Gamma Theta (loca) at Dixie Junior College, which became Dixie College in 1970. It is now called Utah Tech University.) |
| | 19xx ?–192x ? | Centenary Female College | Cleveland, Tennessee | Inactive | (Note: The chapter was still active in 1921. The college closed in 1929.) |
| | 19xx ?–between 1918 and 1921 | Colorado Women's College | Denver, Colorado | Inactive | (Note: The institution merged with the University of Denver in 1982.) |
| | 19xx ?–1918 | Martha Washington College | Abingdon, Virginia | Inactive | (Note: The college merged with Emory & Henry College in 1918.) |
| | 19xx ?–between 1918 and 1921 | St. Katherine's | | Inactive | |
| | 19xx ?–between 1918 and 1921 | Union | | Inactive | |

== Alumnae chapters ==
Following are the known alumnae chapters of Sigma Iota Chi.

| Chapter | Charter date and range | Chapter affiliation | Location | Status | Ref. |
|---|---|---|---|---|---|
| Alpha Delta | 19xx?–19xx? | Vincennes University | Vincennes, Indiana | Inactive | |
| Alpha Epsilon | 19xx?–19xx? | | Keyser, West Virginia | Inactive | |
| Alpha Tau | 19xx?–19xx? | Northeastern Oklahoma A&M College | Miami, Oklahoma | Inactive | |
| Alpha Chi | 19xx?–19xx? | Howard College (now Samford University) | Birmingham, Alabama | Inactive | |
| Alpha Beta Theta | 1939–19xx? | | Providence, Rhode Island | Inactive | |
| Alpha Beta Eta | 19xx?–19xx? | Sacramento Junior College | Sacramento, California | Inactive | |
| Alpha Beta Lambda | April 1936–19xx? | Woodbury College | Los Angeles, California | Inactive | |
| Alpha Kappa Alpha | 19xx?–19xx? | Greenville Woman's College | Greenville, South Carolina | Inactive | |
