= List of Zeta Tau Alpha chapters =

This list of Zeta Tau Alpha chapters includes the undergraduate and alumnae chapters of Zeta Tau Alpha women's fraternity. While given chapter names consisting of Greek letters, ΖΤΑ sometimes refers to its chapters as "Links", referencing the fraternity's "chain of links", a tradition where each installed chapter is represented on a silver chain link that is attached, in a line, to Alpha's original gold link.

Zeta Tau Alpha utilizes a links numbering convention parallel to the order it assigns names using the Greek alphabet. Beginning with the 26th link, when the fraternity completed a round of Greek letters, its next class of links are granted the next Greek letter prefix, starting with Alpha (ex. Alpha Alpha, Alpha Beta, Alpha Gamma.) The prefix Epsilon was skipped as a class and as such, links installed after the Delta class were given the prefix Zeta instead. Occasionally, designations will reflect special circumstances surrounding the chapter's founding rather than the order of the Greek alphabet. Today, new links are not given an official designation or a link number until they are installed; links being re-installed keep their original designation, regardless of when recolonization occurs. Note that a few names remained unassigned in previous decades.

== Links ==
These are the links or chapters of Zeta Tau Alpha. Active links are noted in bold and inactive links and institutions are noted in italics.

| Number | Link | Chartered/range | Institution | City | State | Status | Ref. |
|---|---|---|---|---|---|---|---|
| 1 | **Alpha** | October 15, 1898 – 1906; 1949–2009; 2013 | Longwood University | Farmville | Virginia | Active | (Note: Alpha chapter originally closed in 1906 due to ΖΤΑ's affiliation with the National Panhellenic Conference. Its latest re-installation occurred in 2013. The 1949 reorganization was accomplished with the absorption of Mu Omega (local), a group that had begun in 1925.) |
| 2 | Beta (First) (see Iota) | 1902–1903 | Richmond Women's College | Richmond | Virginia | Reissued | (Note: Due to faculty opposition to the chapter, the first Beta chapter operated sub rosa and is the only chapter of ΖΤΑ to officially do so. The college only used this name for a short time, becoming Westhampton College.) |
| 3 | Gamma | 1902–1904 | Hannah More Academy | Reisterstown | Maryland | Inactive | (Note: Hannah More Academy ceased operations in 1974.) |
| 4 | Delta | 1902–1960 | Randolph-Macon Woman's College | Lynchburg | Virginia | Inactive | (Note: Delta chapter was closed in 1960 due to the banning of Greek letter organizations that year.) |
| 5 | **Epsilon** | December 18, 1903 – 1938; 1947 | University of Arkansas | Fayetteville | Arkansas | Active | (Note: The Epsilon chapter originally began as the local organization Delta Phi.) |
| 6 | **Zeta** | June 14, 1904 | University of Tennessee | Knoxville | Tennessee | Active | |
| 7 | Eta | 1904–1906 | Mary Baldwin College | Staunton | Virginia | Inactive | (Note: Eta chapter originated as Kappa Alpha Pi (local) in 1902.) |
| 8 | **Theta** | March 9, 1905 | Bethany College | Bethany | West Virginia | Active | (Note: Theta chapter originated as Upsilon Alpha Epsilon (local) earlier in 1905.) |
| 9 | Iota (see Beta One) | 1905–1908 | Westhampton College | Richmond | Virginia | Inactive | (Note: Chapter formed at Westhampton College, previously known as Richmond Women's College. In 1920, Westhampton merged with the Richmond College for Men to form the University of Richmond.) |
| 10 | Beta (Second) | 1905–1919 | Judson College | Marion | Alabama | Inactive | (Note: Judson College ceased operations on July 31, 2021.) (Note: Beta chapter (Second) originated as Zeta Sigma (local) in 1902.) |
| 11 | **Kappa** | May 7, 1906 | University of Texas at Austin | Austin | Texas | Active | |
| 12 | **Lambda** | May 31, 1906 | Southwestern University | Georgetown | Texas | Active | (Note: Lambda chapter originated as Beta Psi (local) in 1903.) |
| 13 | **Mu** | March 8, 1909 | Drury University | Springfield | Missouri | Active | (Note: Mu chapter originated as Theta Sigma (local) in 1906.) |
| 14 | **Nu** | April 11, 1910 | University of Alabama | Tuscaloosa | Alabama | Active | (Note: Nu chapter originated as Mu Beta (local) in 1909.) |
| 15 | Xi | 1910–1961 | University of Southern California | Los Angeles | California | Inactive | (Note: Xi chapter originated as Kappa Tau (local) earlier in 1910.) |
| 16 | **Omicron** | January 14, 1911 | Brenau University | Gainesville | Georgia | Active | (Note: Omicron chapter originated as Pi Gamma Theta (local) in 1907.) |
| 17 | Pi | 1911–1914 | Wesleyan College | Macon | Georgia | Inactive | (Note: In an August 1912 report published in ‘’the Adelphean’’, Ms. Newell Mason, a faculty member at Wesleyan and Historian for Alpha Delta Pi, noted that “College authorities are violently opposed to sororities.” A ten-year battle was fought by several NPC organizations, but lost in 1917 when the last members of its four sororities, Alpha Delta Pi, Phi Mu, Zeta Tau Alpha and Delta Delta Delta graduated.) |
| 18 | Rho | 1912–1934, 1959–1968 | Boston University | Boston | Massachusetts | Inactive | (Note: Rho chapter originated as the Pro Re Nata Club (local) in 1907. At its 1959 reorganization it absorbed Sigma Delta Phi (local), which had begun in 1920.) |
| 19 | **Sigma** | May 23, 1912 | Baker University | Baldwin City | Kansas | Active | (Note: Sigma chapter originated as Alpha Theta Nu (local) in 1911.) |
| 20 | Tau | 1912–1995 | Millikin University | Decatur | Illinois | Inactive | (Note: Tau chapter originated as Beta Gamma Kappa (local) in 1909.) |
| 21 | Upsilon | May 14, 1915 – 1969; 2012 – 2026 | University of California, Berkeley | Berkeley | California | Inactive | (Note: Upsilon chapter originated as the Nehahmi Club (local) in 1912.) |
| 22 | **Phi** | June 3, 1915 – 1995; 2005 | Duke University | Durham | North Carolina | Active | (Note: Phi chapter originated as Theta Delta (local) in 1913.) |
| 23 | Chi | 1915–1965 | University of Pittsburgh | Pittsburgh | Pennsylvania | Inactive | (Note: Chi chapter originated as the C.I.C. Club (local) in 1912.) (Note: The Alpha Tau chapter of Beta Sigma Omicron also existed on the Pittsburgh campus until 1964, but failed prior to the national merger with ΖΤΑ that year. No merger between the chapters was effected before the closure of Chi chapter in 1965.) |
| 24 | Omega | 1916–1994 | Southern Methodist University | Dallas | Texas | Inactive | (Note: This chapter originated as a colony, approximately one year before installation.) |
| 25 | **Psi** | September 15, 1917 – 1975; 1978 | University of Washington | Seattle | Washington | Active | |
| 26 | Alpha Alpha | 1918–1943, 1946–1987 | Iowa Wesleyan College | Mount Pleasant | Iowa | Inactive | (Note: Alpha Alpha chapter originated as Omicron Sigma Pi (local) in 1917.) |
| 27 | Alpha Beta | September 22, 1918 – 1954; 2011 - December 18, 2025 | University of Pennsylvania | Philadelphia | Pennsylvania | Inactive | (Note: Alpha Beta chapter originated as Alpha Delta Theta (local) in 1917.) |
| 28 | **Alpha Gamma** | June 1, 1920 – 1951; 1956–1995; 2010 | University of Michigan | Ann Arbor | Michigan | Active | (Note: Alpha Gamma chapter originated as Alpha Gamma (local) in 1919, likely as a planned chapter.) |
| 29 | Alpha Delta | 1920–1956 | Butler University | Indianapolis | Indiana | Inactive | |
| 30 | Alpha Epsilon | 1921–1934 | University of Denver | Denver | Colorado | Inactive | (Note: Alpha Epsilon chapter originated as Sigma Tau Upsilon Chi (local) in 1918.) |
| 31 | **Alpha Zeta** | May 30, 1921 – 1991; 2016 | Ohio State University | Columbus | Ohio | Active | |
| 32 | **Alpha Eta** | June 17, 1921 – 1992; 2018 | University of Cincinnati | Cincinnati | Ohio | Active | (Note: Alpha Eta chapter originated as Sigma Omega Sigma (local) in 1918.) |
| 33 | **Alpha Theta** | September 10, 1921 – 1934; 1947 | Purdue University | West Lafayette | Indiana | Active | (Note: Alpha Theta chapter originated as Phi Zeta (local) in 1919.) |
| 34 | Alpha Iota | 1921–1939 | Lawrence University | Appleton | Wisconsin | Inactive | (Note: Alpha Iota chapter originated as Zeta Omega (local) earlier in 1921.) |
| 35 | Alpha Kappa | 1921–1994 | University of Illinois Urbana-Champaign | Urbana and Champaign | Illinois | Inactive | (Note: The Alpha Kappa chapter originated as Chi Delta (local) in 1920.) |
| 36 | Alpha Lambda | 1921–1929 | Hollins University | Hollins | Virginia | Inactive | (Note: Alpha Lambda chapter originated as Sigma Alpha (local) earlier in 1921.) |
| 37 | **Alpha Mu** | March 3, 1922 | Washburn University | Topeka | Kansas | Active | (Note: Alpha Mu chapter originated as Pi Beta Tau (local) in 1920.) (Note: The two 'locals' that would go on to form Alpha Mu and Alpha Psi chapters had the same name. Were they connected?) |
| 38 | Alpha Nu | October 7, 1922–May 31, 2024 | Birmingham–Southern College | Birmingham | Alabama | Inactive | (Note: Alpha Nu chapter originated as Sigma Beta Gamma (local) in 1920.) |
| 39 | **Alpha Xi** | May 19, 1922 | Indiana University (Bloomington) | Bloomington | Indiana | Active | (Note: Alpha Xi chapter originated as Phi Zeta (local) earlier in 1922.) |
| 40 | **Alpha Omicron** | December 9, 1922 | University of Iowa | Iowa City | Iowa | Active | (Note: Alpha Omicron chapter originated as the Kalo Club (local) in 1919.) |
| 41 | Alpha Pi | 1922–1969, 1980–1985 | Ohio University | Athens | Ohio | Inactive | (Note: Alpha Pi chapter originated as the Alpha chapter of Aloquin in 1905.) |
| 42 | Alpha Rho | 1923–1977 | Syracuse University | Syracuse | New York | Inactive | (Note: Alpha Rho chapter originated as Pi Delta Kappa (local) in 1922.) |
| 43 | Alpha Sigma | 1923–1933, 1960–1985 | Oregon State University | Corvallis | Oregon | Inactive | (Note: Alpha Sigma chapter originated as Beta Alpha (local) in 1921.) |
| 44 | Alpha Tau | 1923–1958 | University of Minnesota | Minneapolis | Minnesota | Inactive | (Note: Alpha Tau chapter originated as Alpha Rho (local) in 1921.) |
| 45 | **Alpha Upsilon** | August 18, 1923 | Oklahoma State University–Stillwater | Stillwater | Oklahoma | Active | (Note: Alpha Upsilon chapter originated as Gamma Chi (local) in 1915.) |
| 46 | Alpha Phi | November 17, 1923 – 1969; 2007-2022 | Northwestern University | Evanston | Illinois | Inactive | (Note: Alpha Phi chapter originated as Omicron Alpha (local) in 1922.) |
| 47 | Alpha Chi | 1924–1992 | University of Kentucky | Lexington | Kentucky | Inactive | (Note: Alpha Chi chapter originated as Pi Alpha Theta (local) in 1922.) |
| 48 | **Alpha Psi** | May 22, 1924 – 1933; 1945 | University of Missouri | Columbia | Missouri | Active | (Note: Alpha Psi chapter originated as Pi Beta Tau (local) in 1922.) |
| 49 | Alpha Omega | 1924–1935, 1949–1966 | Ohio Wesleyan University | Delaware | Ohio | Inactive | (Note: Alpha Omega chapter originated as Gamma Psi Delta (local) in 1922.) |
| 50 | Beta Alpha | 1924–1971 | George Washington University | Washington | District of Columbia | Inactive | (Note: Beta Alpha chapter originated as Gamma Delta Rho (local) in 1920.) |
| 51 | Beta Beta | 1924–1967 | Dickinson College | Carlisle | Pennsylvania | Inactive | (Note: Beta Beta chapter originated as Zeta Epsilon Phi (local) in 1921.) |
| 52 | **Beta Gamma** | December 18, 1924 | Florida State University | Tallahassee | Florida | Active | (Note: Beta Gamma chapter originated as Phi Epsilon (local) in 1922.) |
| 53 | **Beta Delta** | March 18, 1926 | Miami University | Oxford | Ohio | Active | (Note: Beta Delta chapter originated as Delta Pi (local) in 1920.) |
| 54 | Beta Epsilon | 1926–1966, 1977–1986 | University of California, Los Angeles | Los Angeles | California | Inactive | (Note: Beta Epsilon chapter originated as Nu Omega Alpha (local) in 1922.) |
| 55 | Beta Zeta | 1926–1934, 1974–1976 | Iowa State University | Ames | Iowa | Inactive | (Note: Beta Zeta chapter originated as Alpha Chi Beta (local) in 1914.) |
| 56 | Beta Eta | 1927–1937, 1956–1980 | University of Nebraska | Lincoln | Nebraska | Inactive | (Note: Beta Eta chapter originated as Alpha Epsilon (local) in 1923.) |
| 57 | **Beta Theta** | April 11, 1927 | Franklin College | Franklin | Indiana | Active | (Note: Beta Theta chapter originated as Phi Beta Gamma (local) in 1921.) |
| 58 | **Beta Iota** | May 6, 1927 | Centenary College of Louisiana | Shreveport | Louisiana | Active | (Note: Beta Iota chapter originated as Kappa Pi (local) in 1922.) |
| 59 | Beta Kappa | 1927–1957 | Tulane University | New Orleans | Louisiana | Inactive | (Note: Beta Kappa chapter originated as Gamma Phi (local) in 1925.) |
| 60 | **Beta Lambda** | December 17, 1927 – 1943; 1945–1977; 2011 | University of Louisville | Louisville | Kentucky | Active | (Note: Beta Lambda chapter originated as Zeta Delta Pi (local) in 1925.) |
| 61 | Beta Mu | 1928–1940 | Washington State University | Pullman | Washington | Inactive | (Note: Beta Mu chapter originated as Kappa Beta (local) in 1919.) |
| 62 | **Beta Nu** | November 29, 1928 | New Mexico State University | Las Cruces | New Mexico | Active | (Note: Beta Nu chapter originated as Delta Sigma (local) in 1921.) |
| 63 | Beta Xi | 1929–1972 | University of Akron | Akron | Ohio | Inactive | (Note: Beta Xi chapter originated as Kappa Alpha Sigma (local) in 1922.) |
| 64 | **Beta Omicron** | March 4, 1929 | University of South Carolina | Columbia | South Carolina | Active | (Note: Beta Omicron chapter originated as Zeta Phi (local) in 1927.) |
| 65 | Beta Pi | 1929–1943; 1945–1971 | University of Oregon | Eugene | Oregon | Inactive | (Note: Beta Pi chapter originated as Gamma Nu (local) in 1927.) |
| 66 | Beta Rho | 1929–1993 | University of Manitoba | Winnipeg | Manitoba, Canada | Inactive | (Note: This chapter originated as Kappa Tau (local) in 1927.) |
| 67 | Beta Sigma | 1929–1975 | Rhodes College | Memphis | Tennessee | Inactive | (Note: Beta Sigma chapter originated as Chi Alpha (local) in 1926.) |
| 68 | Beta Tau | 1929–1970 | Albion College | Albion | Michigan | Inactive | (Note: Beta Tau chapter originated as the Clionian Club (local) in 1913.) |
| 69 | **Beta Upsilon** | May 6, 1931 – 1940; 2010 | Kansas State University | Manhattan | Kansas | Active | (Note: Beta Upsilon chapter originated as Alpha Theta Chi (local) in 1921.) |
| 70 | **Beta Phi** | October 17, 1931 | Michigan State University | East Lansing | Michigan | Active | (Note: Beta Phi chapter originated as the Sesame Club (local) in 1910.) |
| 71 | Beta Chi | 1931–1956 | Washington University in St. Louis | St. Louis | Missouri | Inactive | (Note: Beta Chi chapter originated as Gamma Epsilon (local) in 1922.) |
| 72 | **Beta Psi** | October 12, 1934 | Stetson University | DeLand | Florida | Active | (Note: Beta Psi chapter originated as Sigma Alpha Phi (local) in 1926.) |
| 73 | **Beta Omega** | December 11, 1935 | Union University | Jackson | Tennessee | Active | (Note: Beta Omega chapter originated as Zeta Gamma (local) in 1932.) |
| 74 | **Gamma Alpha** | March 26, 1938 – 1969; 1992 | University of Miami | Coral Gables | Florida | Active | (Note: Gamma Alpha chapter originated as Sigma Phi (local) in 1927.) |
| 75 | **Gamma Beta** | April 30, 1938 | Washington College | Chestertown | Maryland | Active | (Note: Gamma Beta chapter originated as Gamma Sigma (local) in 1930.) |
| 76 | **Gamma Gamma** | October 7, 1938 | University of Texas at El Paso | El Paso | Texas | Active | (Note: Gamma Gamma chapter originated as Pi Epsilon Pi (local) in 1934.) |
| 77 | Gamma Delta | 1939–1999 | University of Mississippi | Oxford | Mississippi | Inactive | |
| 78 | **Gamma Epsilon** | May 19, 1939 | Pennsylvania State University | University Park | Pennsylvania | Active | (Note: Gamma Epsilon chapter originated as the Eukratia Club (local) in 1938.) |
| 79 | **Gamma Zeta** | April 21, 1940 | Mississippi State University | Starkville | Mississippi | Active | (Note: Gamma Zeta chapter originated as Delta Kappa (local) in 1937.) |
| 80 | Gamma Eta | 1946–1981 | University of Toledo | Toledo | Ohio | Inactive | (Note: Gamma Eta chapter originated as Tau Delta Sigma (local) in 1931.) |
| 81 | Gamma Theta | 1947–1972 | University of Colorado | Boulder | Colorado | Inactive | |
| 82 | **Gamma Iota** | April 2, 1949 | University of Florida | Gainesville | Florida | Active | |
| 83 | **Gamma Pi** | November 5, 1949 | University of Georgia | Athens | Georgia | Active | (Note: Gamma Pi chapter is named after in honor of the Pi chapter of ΖΤΑ, which was closed when women's fraternities were banned at Wesleyan.) |
| 84 | **Gamma Kappa** | November 19, 1949 | James Madison University | Harrisonburg | Virginia | Active | (Note: Gamma Kappa chapter originated as Tau Alpha (local) earlier in 1949.) |
| 85 | Gamma Lambda | 1949–1963 | Hartwick College | Oneonta | New York | Inactive | (Note: This chapter originated as Phi Sigma Phi (local) in 1932.) |
| 86 | **Gamma Mu** | October 7, 1950 | University of Nebraska Omaha | Omaha | Nebraska | Active | (Note: This chapter originated as Sigma Chi Omicron (local) in 1914.) |
| 87 | **Gamma Xi** | May 12, 1951 | Indiana University of Pennsylvania | Indiana County | Pennsylvania | Active | (Note: Gamma Xi chapter originated as Lambda Psi Delta (local) in 1950.) |
| 88 | **Gamma Omicron** | May 19, 1951 | Central Michigan University | Mount Pleasant | Michigan | Active | (Note: Gamma Omicron chapter originated as Phi Delta Eta (local) in 1940.) |
| 89 | **Gamma Rho** | June 15, 1951 – 1971; 1977 | Auburn University | Auburn | Alabama | Active | |
| 90 | **Gamma Nu** | January 5, 1952 – 1966; 1974 | University of Virginia | Charlottesville | Virginia | Active | |
| 91 | **Gamma Sigma** | 1952–1978; November 10, 2024 | University of Tampa | Tampa | Florida | Active | (Note: Gamma Sigma chapter originated as Sigma Theta Phi (local) in 1934.) |
| 92 | **Gamma Tau** | April 11, 1953 | Texas Tech University | Lubbock | Texas | Active | (Note: Gamma Tau chapter originated as Las Vivarechno (local) in 1930. In English, the name means "the lively or vivacious ones".) |
| 93 | Gamma Upsilon | 1953–1965, 1982–2004 | University of Oklahoma | Norman | Oklahoma | Inactive | |
| 94 | **Gamma Phi** | May 23, 1953 | University of North Texas | Denton | Texas | Active | (Note: Gamma Phi chapter originated as Kappa Kappa Kappa (local) in 1939.) |
| 95 | **Gamma Chi** | May 2, 1953 | Indiana State University | Terre Haute | Indiana | Active | (Note: Gamma Chi chapter originated as Epsilon Delta (local) in 1910.) |
| 96 | **Gamma Psi** | April 16, 1955 | Texas Christian University | Fort Worth | Texas | Active | |
| 97 | **Gamma Omega** | February 11, 1956 | University of Houston | Houston | Texas | Active | (Note: Gamma Omega chapter originated as Nu Phi Nu (local) in 1944.) |
| 98 | **Delta Alpha** | February 23, 1957 – 1974; 2016 | California State University, Long Beach | Long Beach | California | Active | |
| 99 | **Delta Beta** | April 27, 1957 | Florida Southern College | Lakeland | Florida | Active | |
| 100 | **Delta Gamma** | May 11, 1957 | High Point University | High Point | North Carolina | Active | (Note: Delta Gamma chapter originated as Lambda Alpha Phi (local) in 1953.) |
| 101 | **Delta Delta** | October 12, 1957 | Baldwin Wallace University | Berea | Ohio | Active | |
| 102 | Delta Epsilon | 1958–1970, 1973–1985 | Wagner College | Staten Island | New York | Inactive | |
| 103 | **Delta Eta** | October 25, 1958 | West Texas A&M University | Canyon | Texas | Active | (Note: Delta Eta chapter originated as Pi Omega (local) in 1925.) |
| 104 | **Delta Zeta** | May 16, 1959 | Sam Houston State University | Huntsville | Texas | Active | (Note: Delta Zeta chapter originated as the Philomethian Club (local) in 1909.) |
| 105 | **Delta Theta** | October 10, 1959 | Ohio Northern University | Ada | Ohio | Active | (Note: Delta Theta chapter originated as Theta Phi Delta (local) in 1909.) |
| 107 | **Delta Kappa** | December 5, 1959 | Louisiana State University | Baton Rouge | Louisiana | Active | |
| 106 | **Delta Iota** | April 30, 1960 | Clarion University of Pennsylvania | Clarion | Pennsylvania | Active | (Note: Delta Iota chapter originated as Lambda Chi Delta (local) in 1931.) |
| 108 | **Delta Mu** | May 13, 1961 | University of Tennessee at Martin | Martin | Tennessee | Active | |
| 109 | **Delta Nu** | October 14, 1961 | University of New Orleans | New Orleans | Louisiana | Active | (Note: Delta Nu chapter originated as the Zeta Club (local) in 1959. Planned colony?) |
| 110 | **Delta Lambda** | November 3, 1961 | Georgia State University | Atlanta | Georgia | Active | |
| 111 | Delta Xi | 1961–1979 | PennWest California | California | Pennsylvania | Inactive | (Note: Delta Xi chapter originated as Zeta Tau (local) in 1959. Planned colony?) |
| 112 | **Delta Omicron** | February 17, 1962 | Lenoir–Rhyne University | Hickory | North Carolina | Active | (Note: Delta Omicron chapter originated as Alpha Sigma Kappa (local) in 1958.) |
| 113 | **Delta Pi** | April 28, 1962 | Eastern New Mexico University | Portales | New Mexico | Active | (Note: Delta Pi chapter originated as Kappa Delta Alpha (local) in 1940.) |
| 114 | Delta Rho | 1963–1977 | Eastern Michigan University | Ypsilanti | Michigan | Inactive | |
| 115 | **Delta Sigma** | February 16, 1963 | Lamar University | Beaumont | Texas | Active | |
| 116 | Delta Tau | 1963–2001 | Davis & Elkins College | Elkins | West Virginia | Inactive | (Note: Delta Tau chapter originated as Kappa Lambda (local) in 1960.) |
| 117 | **Delta Upsilon** | May 4, 1963 | West Virginia Wesleyan College | Buckhannon | West Virginia | Active | (Note: Delta Upsilon chapter originated as Tau Omega Chi (local) in 1961.) |
| 118 | Delta Phi | 1964–1975 | Millsaps College | Jackson | Mississippi | Inactive | (Note: Originated as Chi Kappa (local) in 1925. In 1926 it became the Alpha Zeta chapter of Beta Sigma Omicron, participating in the national merger with ΖΤΑ in 1964, when it became the Delta Phi chapter.) |
| 119 | **Delta Chi** | September 26, 1964 | William Jewell College | Liberty | Missouri | Active | (Note: Originated as Iota Pi (local) in 1919. In 1931 it became the Alpha Psi chapter of Beta Sigma Omicron, participating in the national merger with ΖΤΑ in 1964 when it became the Delta Chi chapter. Another Beta Sigma Omicron chapter, Omicron chapter, had existed from 1908 to 1913 at the nearby Liberty Ladies' College. That institution burned in a fire in 1913 and its students were transferred to William Jewel, with an agreement on co-education and a formal school merger soon following. It is unclear whether there was a connection between any Omicron chapter students who were moved to William Jewel in 1913 and the development of the local sorority, Iota Pi six years later. However the Delta Chi chapter can reasonably claim the former Omicron chapter of ΒΣΟ as a predecessor.) |
| 120 | **Delta Psi** | September 17, 1964 | Samford University (formerly Howard College) | Homewood | Alabama | Active | (Note: Originated as Sigma Iota Chi in 1924. In 1933 it became the Beta Beta chapter of Beta Sigma Omicron, participating in the national merger with ΖΤΑ in 1964, when it became the Delta Psi chapter.) |
| 121 | **Delta Omega** | September 30, 1964 | Westminster College | New Wilmington | Pennsylvania | Active | (Note: Originated as Omicron Mu Gamma (local) in 1928. In 1937 it became the Beta Gamma chapter of Beta Sigma Omicron, participating in the national merger with ΖΤΑ in 1964, when it became the Delta Omega chapter.) |
| 122 | **Zeta Alpha** | September 27, 1964 | University of Evansville | Evansville | Indiana | Active | (Note: Originated as a Beta Sigma Omega colony in 1948 or 1949. In 1949 it became the Beta Theta chapter of Beta Sigma Omicron, participating in the national merger with ΖΤΑ in 1964, when it became the Zeta Alpha chapter.) |
| 123 | **Zeta Beta** | September 28, 1964 | Thiel College | Greenville | Pennsylvania | Active | (Note: Originated as Alpha Sigma Pi (local) in 1919. In 1950 it became the Beta Iota chapter of Beta Sigma Omicron, participating in the national merger with ΖΤΑ in 1964, when it became the Zeta Beta chapter.) |
| 124 | **Zeta Gamma** | October 3, 1964 | Youngstown State University | Youngstown | Ohio | Active | (Note: Originated as a Beta Sigma Omicron colony in 1951. In 1952 it became the Beta Lambda chapter of Beta Sigma Omicron, participating in the national merger with ΖΤΑ in 1964, when it became the Zeta Gamma chapter.) |
| 125 | Zeta Epsilon | 1965–1988 | Texas A&M University - Kingsville | Kingsville | Texas | Inactive | (Note: Zeta Epsilon chapter originated as Delta Theta (local) in 1929.) |
| 126 | Zeta Delta | 1965–1986 | University of Louisiana at Monroe | Monroe | Louisiana | Inactive | |
| 127 | Zeta Zeta | 1966–1982 | Athens State University | Athens | Alabama | Inactive | |
| 128 | Zeta Eta | 1966–1982 | Slippery Rock University | Slippery Rock | Pennsylvania | Inactive | |
| 129 | **Zeta Theta** | April 16, 1966 | East Central University | Ada | Oklahoma | Active | (Note: Zeta Theta chapter originated as Phi Delta Zeta (local) in 1959.) |
| 130 | Zeta Iota | 1966–2002 | Western Carolina University | Cullowhee | North Carolina | Inactive | (Note: Zeta Iota chapter originated as Gamma Sigma Omicron (local) in 1965.) |
| 131 | Zeta Kappa | 1967–1981 | Louisiana Technical University | Ruston | Louisiana | Inactive | |
| 132 | **Zeta Lambda** | April 22, 1967 | Rider University | Lawrence Township | New Jersey | Active | (Note: Zeta Lambda chapter originated as Chi chapter of Eta Upsilon Gamma in 1928.) |
| 133 | Zeta Mu | 1968–1991 | Jacksonville University | Jacksonville | Florida | Inactive | (Note: Zeta Mu chapter originated as Zeta Chi Omega (local) in 1957.) |
| 134 | **Zeta Nu** | May 4, 1968 | Lock Haven University of Pennsylvania | Lock Haven | Pennsylvania | Active | |
| 135 | **Zeta Xi** | April 27, 1968 | Georgia Southern University | Statesboro | Georgia | Active | |
| 136 | **Zeta Omicron** | May 11, 1968 – 1991; 2012 | Arkansas State University | Jonesboro | Arkansas | Active | (Note: Zeta Omicron chapter originated as the Collegians Club (local) in 1965.) |
| 137 | Zeta Pi | 1968–1977 | Woodbury University | Burbank | California | Inactive | (Note: Zeta Pi chapter originated as Alpha Epsilon chapter of Eta Upsilon Gamma in 1932.) |
| 138 | **Zeta Sigma** | April 12, 1969 | University of Texas at Arlington | Arlington | Texas | Active | (Note: Zeta Sigma chapter originated as the Avolonte Club (local) in 1923.) |
| 139 | Zeta Phi | 1969–1994 | University of South Alabama | Mobile | Alabama | Inactive | |
| 140 | Zeta Tau | 1969–1974 | University of North Carolina Wilmington | Wilmington | North Carolina | Inactive | (Note: Zeta Tau chapter originated as Sigma Phi Sigma (local) in 1967.) |
| 141 | Zeta Chi | 1969–2008 | Tennessee Technological University | Cookeville | Tennessee | Inactive | (Note: Zeta Chi chapter originated as Chi Delta Tau (local) in 1967.) |
| 142 | **Zeta Psi** | December 6, 1969 | Jacksonville State University | Jacksonville | Alabama | Active | |
| 143 | **Zeta Upsilon** | March 14, 1970 | PennWest Edinboro | Edinboro | Pennsylvania | Active | |
| 144 | **Eta Gamma** | April 11, 1970 | West Chester University | West Chester | Pennsylvania | Active | (Note: Eta Gamma chapter originated as Sigma Chi Omega (local) in 1968.) |
| 145 | **Zeta Omega** | April 25, 1970 | Ferris State University | Big Rapids | Michigan | Active | (Note: Zeta Omega chapter originated as Alpha Theta Chi (local) in 1969.) |
| 146 | **Eta Beta** | April 26, 1970 | Duquesne University | Pittsburgh | Pennsylvania | Active | (Note: Eta Beta chapter originated as Alpha Phi Omicron (local) in 1928.) |
| 147 | **Eta Alpha** | May 2, 1970 | Georgia Southwestern State University | Americus | Georgia | Active | |
| 148 | Zeta Rho | May 16, 1970 – 1982 | Morehead State University | Morehead | Kentucky | Inactive | |
| 149 | **Eta Epsilon** | February 27, 1971 | Mansfield University of Pennsylvania | Mansfield | Pennsylvania | Active | |
| 150 | **Eta Zeta** | April 17, 1971 | Elon University | Elon | North Carolina | Active | (Note: Eta Zeta chapter originated as Delta Upsilon Kappa (local) prior to 1971. Baird's Archive says 1972, but this is obviously a typo.) |
| 151 | Eta Eta | 1971–1982 | McNeese State University | Lake Charles | Louisiana | Inactive | |
| 152 | **Eta Iota** | May 22, 1971 | Valdosta State University | Valdosta | Georgia | Active | |
| 153 | Eta Delta | 1971–1979 | University of West Alabama | Livingston | Alabama | Inactive | (Note: Eta Delta chapter originated as Delta Chi Omega (local) in 1960.) |
| 154 | **Eta Kappa** | December 11, 1971 | University of Central Florida | Orlando | Florida | Active | (Note: Eta Kappa chapter originated as the Fideles Club (local) in 1969.) |
| 155 | **Eta Lambda** | April 8, 1972 | College of Charleston | Charleston | South Carolina | Active | |
| 156 | Eta Nu | April 22, 1972 | Radford University | Radford | Virginia | Inactive | (Note: Eta Nu chapter originated as Chi Lambda Phi (local) in 1971.) |
| 157 | **Eta Xi** | April 29, 1972 | Virginia Tech | Blacksburg | Virginia | Active | |
| 158 | **Eta Mu** | May 20, 1972 | Augusta University | Augusta | Georgia | Active | |
| 159 | Eta Omicron | 1973–1979 | Western Illinois University | Macomb | Illinois | Inactive | |
| 160 | **Eta Rho** | March 3, 1973 | University of North Alabama | Florence | Alabama | Active | |
| 161 | **Eta Theta** | May 5, 1973 | Missouri University of Science and Technology | Rolla | Missouri | Active | (Note: Eta Theta chapter originated as Sigma Delta (local) in 1971.) |
| 162 | **Eta Pi** | May 19, 1973 | Wright State University | Dayton | Ohio | Active | |
| 163 | **Eta Sigma** | September 8, 1973 | University of North Carolina at Pembroke | Pembroke | North Carolina | Active | |
| 164 | **Eta Tau** | April 20, 1974 | University of North Carolina at Charlotte | Charlotte | North Carolina | Active | |
| 165 | **Eta Phi** | April 27, 1974 | Illinois State University | Normal | Illinois | Active | |
| 166 | **Eta Upsilon** | May 11, 1974 | Missouri Southern State University | Joplin | Missouri | Active | (Note: Eta Upsilon chapter originated as Delta Phi Delta (local) in 1968.) |
| 167 | **Eta Chi** | November 9, 1974 | Francis Marion University | Florence | South Carolina | Active | (Note: Eta Chi chapter originated as Alpha Zeta Tau (local) in 1973.) |
| 168 | Eta Omega | 1975–2009 | Louisiana State University Shreveport | Shreveport | Louisiana | Inactive | (Note: Eta Omega chapter originated as the Crown Club (local) in 1974.) |
| 169 | Eta Psi | 1975–1995 | California Polytechnic State University | San Luis Obispo | California | Inactive | |
| 170 | Theta Alpha | 1975–2003 | California State University, Chico | Chico | California | Inactive | |
| 171 | **Theta Gamma** | May 24, 1975 | Texas A&M University | College Station | Texas | Active | |
| 172 | **Theta Delta** | December 6, 1975 | Salisbury University | Salisbury | Maryland | Active | |
| 173 | Theta Beta | 1976–1979 | Eastern Washington University | Cheney | Washington | Inactive | |
| 174 | **Theta Theta** | January 22, 1977 | Arkansas Tech University | Russellville | Arkansas | Active | (Note: Theta Theta chapter originated as Alpha Lambda Zeta (local) in 1970.) |
| 175 | **Theta Iota** | February 19, 1977 | University of North Florida | Jacksonville | Florida | Active | |
| 176 | **Theta Eta** | March 19, 1977 | Stephen F. Austin State University | Nacogdoches | Texas | Active | (Note: Theta Eta chapter originated as Kappa Epsilon (local) in 1976.) |
| 177 | **Theta Kappa** | August 27, 1977 | University of Missouri–St. Louis | St. Louis | Missouri | Active | |
| 178 | **Theta Omicron** | December 3, 1977 | Baylor University | Waco | Texas | Active | |
| 179 | **Theta Zeta** | February 4, 1972 | Wofford College | Spartanburg | South Carolina | Active | (Note: Theta Zeta chapter originated as a colony in 1975.) |
| 180 | **Theta Xi** | February 25, 1978 | Rutgers University | New Brunswick | New Jersey | Active | |
| 181 | Theta Lambda | 1978–1980 | Belmont Abbey College | Belmont | North Carolina | Inactive | |
| 182 | Theta Nu | April 15, 1978--June 2026 | Auburn University at Montgomery | Montgomery | Alabama | Inactive | |
| 183 | Theta Mu | 1978–1980 | Bowling Green State University | Bowling Green | Ohio | Inactive | |
| – | Theta Rho ? | 1978–1983 | Oregon Institute of Technology ? | Klamath Falls | Oregon | Inactive | |
| 184 | **Theta Sigma** | October 28, 1978 | Winthrop University | Rock Hill | South Carolina | Active | (Note: Theta Sigma chapter originated as Omega Phi (local), established before 1978. The chapter was reorganized in 2013 but retained its charter throughout that period.) |
| 185 | Theta Pi | 1978–1992 | California State University, Northridge | Northridge, Los Angeles | California | Inactive | |
| 186 | **Theta Tau** | February 10, 1979 | University of North Carolina at Chapel Hill | Chapel Hill | North Carolina | Active | |
| 187 | **Theta Phi** | May 5, 1979 | California State University, Fullerton | Fullerton | California | Active | |
| 188 | Theta Upsilon | 1979–1983 | Santa Clara University | Santa Clara | California | Inactive | |
| 189 | Theta Epsilon | 1979–1994 | University of San Diego | San Diego | California | Inactive | |
| 190 | **Theta Psi** | May 3, 1980 | Texas State University–San Marcos | San Marcos | Texas | Active | |
| 191 | **Theta Chi** | October 18, 1980 | George Mason University | Fairfax | Virginia | Active | (Note: Theta Chi chapter originated as Delta Sigma Delta (local) in 1970.) |
| 192 | **Iota Alpha** | November 15, 1971 | Robert Morris University | Moon Township | Pennsylvania | Active | (Note: Iota Alpha chapter originated as Omega Epsilon Theta (local) in 1977.) |
| 193 | **Theta Omega** | November 22, 1980 | California State Polytechnic University, Pomona | Pomona | California | Active | |
| 194 | **Iota Gamma** | January 31, 1981 | The College of New Jersey | Ewing Township | New Jersey | Active | |
| 195 | **Iota Delta** | February 7, 1981 | Towson University | Towson | Maryland | Active | |
| 196 | Iota Zeta | 1983–1992 | University of New Mexico | Albuquerque | New Mexico | Inactive | |
| 197 | Iota Epsilon | 1984–1992 | University of Hartford | West Hartford | Connecticut | Inactive | |
| 198 | **Iota Theta** | May 19, 1984 | Georgia Institute of Technology | Atlanta | Georgia | Active | |
| 199 | **Iota Eta** | June 2, 1984 – 1995; 2010 | University of Nevada, Las Vegas | Las Vegas | Nevada | Active | |
| 200 | **Iota Iota** | August 29, 1984 | Fairleigh Dickinson University | Madison | New Jersey | Active | |
| 201 | Iota Kappa | 1985–1998 | Delta State University | Cleveland | Mississippi | Inactive | |
| 202 | Iota Mu | 1985–1997 | University of Central Missouri | Warrensburg | Missouri | Inactive | |
| 203 | Iota Lambda | 1985–1993 | Southeast Missouri State University | Cape Girardeau | Missouri | Inactive | |
| 204 | Iota Xi | November 23, 1985–2024 | Christian Brothers University | Memphis | Tennessee | Inactive | (Note: Iota Xi chapter originated as Chi Beta Chi (local) in 1984.) |
| 205 | **Iota Nu** | December 7, 1985 | Susquehanna University | Selinsgrove | Pennsylvania | Active | |
| 206 | **Iota Omicron** | April 19, 1986 | Lander University | Greenwood | South Carolina | Active | (Note: Iota Omicron chapter originated as Zeta Alpha Chi (local) in 1983.) |
| 207 | **Iota Pi** | March 21, 1987 | University of Dayton | Dayton | Ohio | Active | (Note: Iota Pi chapter originated as Kappa Chi (local) in 1969.) |
| 208 | **Iota Sigma** | March 21, 1987 | Old Dominion University | Norfolk | Virginia | Active | |
| 209 | **Iota Rho** | March 28, 1987 | East Carolina University | Greenville | North Carolina | Active | |
| 210 | Iota Upsilon | 1988–1992 | University of Portland | Portland | Oregon | Inactive | |
| 211 | **Iota Phi** | February 4, 1989 | North Carolina State University | Raleigh | North Carolina | Active | |
| 212 | **Iota Chi** | October 13, 1989 | Middle Tennessee State University | Murfreesboro | Tennessee | Active | |
| 213 | **Iota Psi** | November 4, 1989 | Rochester Institute of Technology | Rochester | New York | Active | |
| 214 | **Iota Tau** | 1990–1993; October 26, 2025 | University of Utah | Salt Lake City | Utah | Active | |
| 215 | **Kappa Beta** | February 17, 1990 | Presbyterian College | Clinton | South Carolina | Active | |
| 216 | **Iota Omega** | March 10, 1990 | University of Maryland | College Park | Maryland | Active | |
| 217 | **Kappa Alpha** | March 31, 1990 – 2005; 2008 | Colorado State University | Fort Collins | Colorado | Active | |
| 218 | Kappa Gamma | 1990–1995 | West Virginia University | Morgantown | West Virginia | Inactive | |
| 219 | Kappa Delta | 1991–1996 | University of Arizona | Tucson | Arizona | Inactive | |
| 220 | **Kappa Zeta** | April 13, 1991 | Clemson University | Clemson | South Carolina | Active | |
| 221 | **Kappa Eta** | April 16, 1994 | Rockhurst University | Kansas City | Missouri | Active | |
| 222 | Kappa Kappa | 1995–2004 | Southern Utah University | Cedar City | Utah | Inactive | |
| 223 | **Kappa Theta** | June 10, 1995 | California State University, San Bernardino | San Bernardino | California | Active | |
| 224 | **Kappa Iota** | March 15, 1997 | Moravian University | Bethlehem | Pennsylvania | Active | (Note: Formed originally as Alpha Epsilon Pi, a local sorority, in 1901. This group had no connection to the national fraternity of the same name. After existing for 96 years as an independent group, in 1997 it was installed as the Kappa Iota chapter of ΖΤΑ.) |
| 225 | **Kappa Lambda** | November 22, 1997 | University of Wisconsin–Oshkosh | Oshkosh | Wisconsin | Active | |
| 226 | **Kappa Mu** | May 16, 1998 | Linfield University | McMinnville, and Portland | Oregon | Active | |
| 227 | **Kappa Nu** | 1998–2018; April 26, 2025 | Monmouth University | West Long Branch | New Jersey | Active | (Note: Kappa Nu chapter originated as Gamma Sigma Sigma (local) in 1988.) |
| 228 | **Kappa Xi** | March 25, 2000 | Stockton University | Galloway Township | New Jersey | Active | |
| 229 | **Kappa Omicron** | April 21, 2001 | Merrimack College | North Andover | Massachusetts | Active | |
| 230 | **Kappa Pi** | December 8, 2001 | University of South Carolina Aiken | Aiken | South Carolina | Active | |
| 231 | **Kappa Rho** | February 16, 2002 | University of South Carolina Upstate | Valley Falls | South Carolina | Active | |
| 232 | **Kappa Sigma** | February 7, 2004 | University of South Florida | Tampa | Florida | Active | |
| 233 | **Kappa Tau** | April 17, 2004 | Florida Gulf Coast University | Fort Myers | Florida | Active | |
| 234 | **Kappa Upsilon** | November 20, 2004 | Georgia College & State University | Milledgeville | Georgia | Active | |
| 235 | **Kappa Phi** | April 23, 2005 | Christopher Newport University | Newport News | Virginia | Active | |
| 236 | **Kappa Chi** | December 3, 2005 | Shorter University | Rome | Georgia | Active | |
| 237 | **Kappa Psi** | December 9, 2006 | Kutztown University of Pennsylvania | Kutztown | Pennsylvania | Active | |
| 238 | **Kappa Omega** | November 17, 2007 | Saint Louis University | St. Louis | Missouri | Active | |
| 239 | **Lambda Alpha** | April 19, 2009 | Sacred Heart University | Fairfield | Connecticut | Active | (Note: Lambda Alpha chapter originated as Beta Delta Phi (local) in 1964.) |
| 240 | **Lambda Beta** | May 2, 2009 | University of Rhode Island | Kingston | Rhode Island | Active | (Note: Lambda Beta chapter originated as the Zeta Club (local) in 2002.) |
| 241 | **Lambda Gamma** | January 30, 2010 | University of Texas at San Antonio | San Antonio | Texas | Active | |
| 242 | **Lambda Delta** | January 31, 2010 | Texas A&M University-Corpus Christi | Corpus Christi | Texas | Active | |
| 243 | **Lambda Epsilon** | December 11, 2010 | Indiana University–Purdue University Indianapolis | Indianapolis | Indiana | Active | |
| 244 | **Lambda Zeta** | April 9, 2011 | Lehigh University | Bethlehem | Pennsylvania | Active | |
| 245 | **Lambda Eta** | November 19, 2011 | Virginia Commonwealth University | Richmond | Virginia | Active | |
| 246 | **Lambda Theta** | December 10, 2011 | New York University | New York City | New York | Active | |
| 247 | **Lambda Iota** | March 24, 2012 | Vanderbilt University | Nashville | Tennessee | Active | |
| 248 | **Lambda Kappa** | December 1, 2012 | Appalachian State University | Boone | North Carolina | Active | |
| 249 | **Lambda Lambda** | November 8, 2014 | Kennesaw State University | Cobb County | Georgia | Active | |
| 250 | Lambda Mu | April 12, 2015–2023 | University of South Carolina Beaufort | Beaufort | South Carolina | Inactive | |
| 251 | **Lambda Nu** | April 12, 2015 | Furman University | Greenville | South Carolina | Active | |
| 252 | **Lambda Xi** | November 11, 2016 | Seton Hall University | South Orange | New Jersey | Active | |
| 253 | **Lambda Omicron** | January 20, 2018 | Boise State University | Boise | Idaho | Active | |
| 254 | **Lambda Pi** | March 24, 2018 | Reinhardt University | Waleska | Georgia | Active | |
| 255 | **Lambda Rho** | October 21, 2018 | Piedmont University | Demorest and Athens | Georgia | Active | |
| 256 | **Lambda Sigma** | November 10, 2018 | University of Texas at Tyler | Tyler | Texas | Active | |
| 257 | **Lambda Tau** | November 21, 2020 | Long Island University at Brooklyn | Brooklyn | New York | Active | |
| 258 | **Lambda Upsilon** | November 21, 2021 | University of Wisconsin–Madison | Madison | Wisconsin | Active | |
| 259 | **Lambda Phi** | April 24, 2022 | Binghamton University | Binghamton | New York | Active | |

== Alumnae chapters ==
| Chapter | State/province | Status | Ref. |
|---|---|---|---|
| Abilene | Texas | Active | |
| Ann Arbor Area | Michigan | Active | |
| Auburn-Opelika | Alabama | Active | |
| Bergen County | New Jersey | Active | |
| Birmingham | Alabama | Active | |
| Boulder | Colorado | Active | |
| Buffalo | New York | Active | |
| Central New Jersey | New Jersey | Active | |
| Chattanooga Area | Tennessee | Active | |
| Cookeville | Tennessee | Active | |
| Decatur | Alabama | Active | |
| East Bay | California | Active | |
| Eastern New Mexico | New Mexico | Active | |
| Ft. Collins | Colorado | Active | |
| Fredericksburg | Virginia | Active | |
| Gwinnett County | Georgia | Active | |
| Huntsville | Alabama | Active | |
| Inland/Pomona | California | Active | |
| Jackson | Tennessee | Active | |
| Jersey Shore | New Jersey | Active | |
| Jonesboro | Arkansas | Active | |
| Knoxville | Tennessee | Active | |
| Lawrence Area | Kansas | Active | |
| Little Rock | Arkansas | Active | |
| Long Beach | California | Active | |
| Martin | Tennessee | Active | |
| Memphis | Tennessee | Active | |
| Mercer-Bucks | New Jersey | Active | |
| Milwaukee/Southeastern WI | Wisconsin | Active | |
| Mobile | Alabama | Active | |
| Montgomery | Alabama | Active | |
| Murfreesboro | Tennessee | Active | |
| Nashville | Tennessee | Active | |
| New York City | New York | Active | |
| North Orange County | California | Active | |
| North Valley | California | Active | |
| Northeast Alabama | Alabama | Active | |
| Northern Arizona | Arizona | Active | |
| Northern New Jersey | New Jersey | Active | |
| Northwest Alabama | Alabama | Active | |
| Northwest Arkansas | Arkansas | Active | |
| Pasadena | California | Active | |
| Phoenix | Arizona | Active | |
| Pike's Peak Region | Colorado | Active | |
| Rochester | New York | Active | |
| Rocky Mountain | Colorado | Active | |
| Sacramento | California | Active | |
| San Diego | California | Active | |
| San Fernando Valley | California | Active | |
| San Francisco and Marin Counties | California | Active | |
| Southern New Jersey | New Jersey | Active | |
| Southern Peninsula | California | Active | |
| Tallahassee | Florida | Active | |
| Toronto | Ontario | Active | |
| Tri-Cities | Tennessee | Active | |
| Tucson | Arizona | Active | |
| Tuscaloosa | Alabama | Active | |
| Washington, D.C. | | Active | |
| Western Fairfax | Virginia | Active | |
| Westside-Santa Monica | California | Active | |
| Winnipeg | Manitoba | Active | |
| Youngstown | Ohio | Active | |
| Zetas Abroad | United Kingdom | Active | |
| ZTAlways | Global | Active | |
| Research Triangle | North Carolina | Active | |
| Greater Charlotte | North Carolina | Active | |
| Wilmington | North Carolina | Active | |
| Winston-Salem/Greensboro | North Carolina | Active | |
| Blue Ridge (Asheville) | North Carolina | Active | |
| High Country (Boone) | North Carolina | Active | |
| Hickory-Morganton | North Carolina | Active | |
| Fayetteville-Pembroke | North Carolina | Active | |
| Greenville | North Carolina | Active | |

== See also ==
- List of Zeta Tau Alpha members
