= Eta Upsilon Gamma =

Defunct American collegiate sorority

- ΗΥΓ
- Eta Upsilon Gamma badge
- Founded: November 1901; 124 years ago Christian College, now Columbia College of Missouri
- Type: Social
- Affiliation: NJCP
- Status: Defunct
- Defunct date: After 1968
- Emphasis: originally 2-yr, later 4-yr schools
- Scope: National
- Motto: "Be Strong in the Truth"
- Colors: Olive green and Gold
- Jewel: Diamond and Pearl
- Publication: The Adamas
- Philanthropy: Crippled Children's Society
- Chapters: 30
- Members: 8,000+ lifetime
- Nickname: Gamma
- Headquarters: United States

Eta Upsilon Gamma (ΗΥΓ) was an American collegiate junior sorority. It formed in 1901, and was active through at least 1968. The sorority was a founding member of the National Junior College Panhellenic.

== History ==
Eta Upsilon Gamma was founded as a junior college sorority in November 1901 at Christian College (now Columbia College) in Columbia, Missouri. Its founders were Bess Dain Browning, Caroline Mabry Christie, Anna Hudson Lewis, Eula Gray Pfeuffer, Nell Mackey Powell, and Anne McDonald Smith.

The Beta chapter was established at Hardin College and Conservatory of Music in 1902. This was followed in 1903 by Gamma at the Liberty Ladies' College, Delta at Forest Park University, and Epsilon at Central College for Women. Its first six chapters were all chartered at colleges in Missouri.

Eta Upsilon Gamma was overseen by a national board or grand council, consisting of a grand president, grand vice-president and editor, grand secretary, grand treasurer, grand organizer, and a Panhellenic representative. Officers were elected at the annual national conclave or convention. The sorority held its first conclave in Columbia, Missouri in 1904.

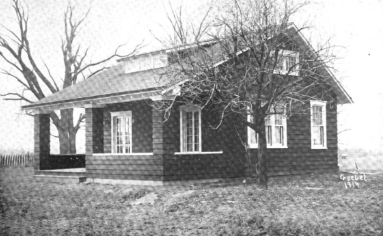
Lindenwood College chapter house, 1914

By 1909, Eta Upsilon Gamma had established an alumni association. That same year, the sorority made the news for deposing two of its national officers, Eva Marie Myers who was the grand president and Mattie Lou Catron grand organizer, for getting married. The Eta Upsilon Gamma constitution specified that its grand chapter officers "must be neither betrothed or married". It continued, "Man has no place in the organization of the sorority, and the rule against the members who yield to him is rigidly enforced." In addition, members who allowed a man to wear their sorority badge were fined $25 ($896 in 2022 money); failure to pay this fine resulted in expulsion from the sorority.

The Alpha chapter at Christian College built its chapter house in the summer of 1910 and dedicated it on May 18, 1911. It was not a residential house but was used for meetings, social events, and for alumnae accommodations. The Zeta chapter at Lindenwood College dedicated its chapter house in 1914. In September 1914, Eta Upsilon Gamma was a founding member of the National Junior College Panhellenic.

In 1919, the sorority had nine active chapters and two alumnae associations. It had initiated 1,500 members and had 170 active members. In 1921, it had seven active chapters and six alumnae associations, with 2,000 total members and 100 active members.

As the sorority's host institutions became four-year colleges, some chapters left to join National Panhellenic Conference members. Eta Upsilon Gamma decided to become a regular collegiate sorority. At this time, it withdrew the charter of any chapters hosted at junior colleges. In an article in the January 1926 Banta's Greek Exchange, the sorority's vice president wrote an article noting, "The junior college does not define or limit the field of Eta Upsilon Gamma." Baird's Manual (1930) shows 26 chapters of which twelve were active and fourteen were inactive. On June 16, 1932, a delegation from Eta Upsilon Gamma had lunch with President Herbert Hoover.

In November 1951, the sorority celebrated its fiftieth anniversary by establishing a Memorial Art Library at Christian College, consisting of circulating fine art reproductions. In February 1962, Eta Upsilon Gamma had initiated 8,000 members and had nine active chapters. The sorority's date of dissolution is unknown. Its last known national convention was held in August 1968. The Omega chapter at Potomac State School was active until 1975 when it became a local sorority.

== Symbols ==
The Eta Upsilon Gamma insignia was designed in 1908 by Zeta chapter members Edna Hanna and Jae Fonte. The insignia consisted of a shield that featured a lamp on top of an equilateral triangle and the motto "Be Strong in the Truth", supported by a unicorn. The sorority's badge was a diamond-shaped shield in black enamel bearing in center clasped hands, with the Greek letters "ΗΥΓ" above it and a skull and cross bones below. The badge could be set in pearls. The pledge pin was gold, with clasp hands.

The sorority also had a scholarship pin in the shape of a gold Greek lamp with a small diamond in its blue flame and the Greek letters "ΗΥΓ" in black enamel. It was worn by the member with the highest average grades in each chapter. The lamp symbolized higher scholarship and the diamond in its flame represented the light or torch of knowledge.

The sorority's colors were olive green and gold. Its jewels were the diamond and the pearl. Its flower was the red carnation as of 1909 and the yellow rose as of 1919. Its insignia were clasped hands, a skull and cross-bones, a diamond, a lamp, a triangle, and a unicorn. Its original flag was olive green with the Greek letters "ΗΥΓ" in gold; a later version also featured the sorority's coat of arms.

The sorority's open motto was "Be Strong in the Truth". Its bi-annual publication was The Adamas, first published in 1909. Its nickname was Gamma.

== Philanthropy ==
In 1962, Eta Upsilon Gamma's national philanthropy was the Crippled Children's Society. During World War I, the sorority raised funds for the Red Cross; some members volunteered for Y.M.C.A. canteen work in France.

== Chapters ==
Eta Upsilon Gamma installed over thirty chapters. Following is a list of Eta Upsilon Gamma chapters, with inactive chapters and institutions in italics.

Chapter	Charter date and range	Institution	Location	Status	Ref.
Alpha	November 1901–1915	Christian College	Columbia, Missouri	Inactive	(Note: The college banned sororities after the 1914-15 academic year.)
Beta	1902–1931	Hardin College	Mexico, Missouri	Inactive	(Note: Chapter went dormant when the college closed.)
Gamma	1903–1913	Liberty Ladies' College	Liberty, Missouri	Inactive	(Note: Chapter went dormant when William Jewell College absorbed the college.)
Delta	1903–1912	Forest Park University	St. Louis, Missouri	Inactive	
Epsilon	1903–1925	Central College for Women	Lexington, Missouri	Inactive	
Zeta	May 25, 1905 – 1920	Lindenwood College	St. Charles, Missouri	Inactive	
Eta	1908–1909	Pleasant J. Potter College	Bowling Green, Kentucky	Inactive	(Note: Chapter went defunct when the college was absorbed by Western Kentucky State Normal School.)
Theta	1910–1915	Boscobel College	Nashville, Tennessee	Inactive	
Iota	1910–1914	Judson College	Marion, Alabama	Inactive	
Kappa	1910 – November 24, 1911	Brenau College	Gainesville, Georgia	Merged (ΑΧΩ)	(Note: Approximately a year after its establishment, this chapter withdrew to become the Tau chapter of Alpha Chi Omega.)
Lambda	1910–1920	Colorado Women's College	Denver, Colorado	Inactive	
Mu	1912–1920	Ward–Belmont College	Nashville, Tennessee	Inactive	
Nu	1913–1937	Greenville Woman's College	Greenville, South Carolina	Inactive	(Note: Chapter went dormant when Furman University absorbed the college.)
Xi	March 21, 1914 – 1919	Centenary Female College	Cleveland, Tennessee	Inactive	(Note: Chapter formed from Kappa Psi (local), established in 1911.)
Omicron	1917–1932	Belhaven College	Jackson, Mississippi	Inactive	
Pi	1917–1938	Stephens College	Columbia, Missouri	Inactive	(Note: Chapter formed from Mu Epsilon (local), established in 1912. When it withdrew in 1938, it became Eta Epsilon Gamma (local) and then in 1997 became a chapter of Sigma Sigma Sigma)
Rho	1917–1921	Fulton Female Synodical College	Fulton, Missouri	Inactive	
Sigma	1922–1923	Eastern College	Manassas, Virginia	Inactive	
Tau	1924–1931	Logan College	Russellville, Kentucky	Inactive	
Upsilon	1924–1932	Hamilton College	Lexington, Kentucky	Inactive	
Phi	1925–1926	Hedding College	Abingdon, Illinois	Inactive	(Note: Chapter went dormant when Illinois Wesleyan University absorbed the college.)
Chi	1927 – April 22, 1967	Rider College	Trenton, New Jersey	Merged (ΖΤΑ)	(Note: Chapter formed from the Eromathaen Echo club, established in 1925.) (Note: This became the Zeta Lambda chapter of Zeta Tau Alpha sorority when Rider became a four-year college.)
Psi	1928–1954	Northeastern Oklahoma Junior College	Miami, Oklahoma	Inactive	
Omega	1928–1975	Potomac State School	Keyser, West Virginia	Inactive	(Note: The chapter became a local sorority.)
Alpha Alpha	1929–196x ?	Bliss College	Columbus, Ohio	Inactive	(Note: Chater was active as of 1930.) (Note: Chapter was still active in February 1962.)
Alpha Beta	1929–19xx ?	Dodd College	Shreveport, Louisiana	Inactive	(Note: The chapter was active in 1936 according to the Dodd College Yearbook (1936). The college closed in 1942.)
Alpha Gamma	1931–1939	Mississippi Synodical College	Holly Springs, Mississippi	Inactive	
Alpha Delta	1931–1933	Crane Junior College	Chicago, Illinois	Inactive	
Alpha Epsilon	1932–1968	Woodbury College	Los Angeles, California	Merged (ΖΤΑ)	(Note: Became the Zeta Pi chapter of Zeta Tau Alpha sorority.)
Alpha Zeta	19xx ?–19xx ?	Greenbrier College	Lewisburg, West Virginia	Inactive	(Note: The college closed in 1972.)
Alpha Eta	1937–19xx ?	Bergen College	Teaneck, New Jersey	Inactive	(Note: The chapter was chartered at Bergen Junior College, which later became Bergen College. It merged with Fairleigh Dickinson College in 1953.)
Alpha Theta		University of Texas at Austin	Austin, Texas	Inactive	
Alpha Iota	1940–19xx ?	West Virginia Training School for Dental Hygienists	Charleston, West Virginia	Inactive	
Alpha Kappa	1944–1961	Tennessee Wesleyan College	Athens, Tennessee	Merged (ΑΞΔ)	(Note: Chapter formed from Alpha Gamma, established in 1930. When it withdrew, it became the Gamma Chi chapter of Alpha Xi Delta.)
Alpha Lambda	1950–19xx ?	Sacramento City College	Sacramento, California	Inactive	(Note: Chapter was formed at the Sacramento Junior College which became Sacramento City College in 1964. The chapter was still active in 1967 but was dormant before 1971.)
Alpha Mu	October 20, 1961 – 19xx ?	Draughon's College of Commerce	Kansas City, Missouri	Inactive	
Alpha Nu	December 1961–19xx ?	Miller-Draughon College	Cincinnati, Ohio	Inactive	
Alpha Xi	February 16, 1963 – 1967	Angelo State University	San Angelo, Texas	Withdrew (local)	(Note: Chapter originated as Sigma Alpha Phi (local), established in 1943. In November 1961, twenty Sigma Alpha Phi members formed Eta Upsilon (local), with the intent of becoming a chapter of Eta Upsilon Gamma, which it did in 1963.) (Note: The chapter withdrew in 1967 to become Gamma Chi sorority (local), thus taking on a fourth name. It retained Eta Upsilon Gamma's philanthropy, helping crippled children.)

== Alumnae associations ==
By 1909, Eta Upsilon Gamma had established an alumni association. Following is a list of known alumnae association chapters.

- Cleveland, Tennessee
- Denver, Colorado
- Greenville, South Carolina
- Kansas City, Missouri
- Mexico, Missouri
- Montgomery, Missouri
- Nashville, Tennessee
- St. Charles, Missouri
- St. Louis, Missouri

== Conclaves ==
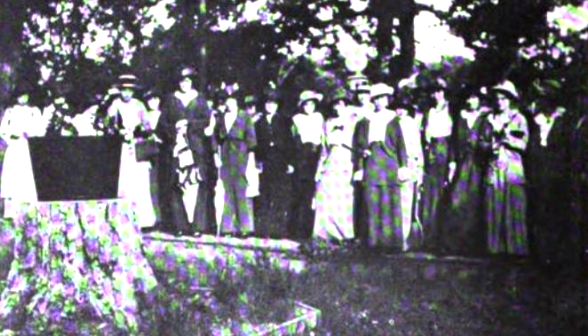
Eta Upsilon Gamma conclave, Nashville, Tennessee, June 1914

The Eta Upsilon Gamma national annual conclaves included:

- 1904 – Columbia, Missouri
- June 8, 1905 – Columbia, Missouri
- June 28 and 29, 1906 – Kansas City, Missouri
- June 27 and 28, 1907 – St. Louis, Missouri
- June 23 to 26, 1908 – Mexico, Missouri

Later, the conclaves were held every other year. The biannual conclaves include:

- June 8 to 10, 1910 – St. Charles, Missouri
- 1912 – Pertle Springs, Warrenburg, Missouri
- June 1914 – Nashville, Tennessee
- 1916 – Palmer Lake, Colorado
- 1918 – Kansas City, Missouri
- 1920 – Excelsior Springs, Missouri
- 1922 – Excelsior Springs, Missouri
- June 4, 1924 – Mexico, Missouri
- 1926 – Louisville, Kentucky
- June 1928 – Kansas City, Missouri
- June 1930 – Memphis, Tennessee
- June 1932 – Washington, D.C.
- July 1934 – Chicago, Illinois
- June 11 to 19, 1936 – St. Louis, Missouri
- June 16 to 19, 1938 – Columbus, Ohio
- June 1940 – Trenton, New Jersey
- June 25 to 28, 1942 – Williamburg, Virginia
- June 10 to 14, 1946 – Williamburg, Virginia
- August 1950 – Greenbrier College in Lewisburg, West Virginia, with Zeta Mu Epsilon (Note: Zeta Mu Epsilon was another sorority serving 2-year schools.)
- August 1952 – Kansas City, Missouri
- August 21 to 23, 1954 – Columbus, Ohio
- August 1956 – Los Angeles, California
- August 22 to 24, 1958 – Trenton, New Jersey
- August 1960 – Columbus, Ohio
- August 17 to 19, 1962 – Kansas City, Missouri
- August 21 to 23, 1964 – San Angelo College in San Angelo, Texas
- August 1966 – Los Angeles, California
- August 8 to 10, 1968 – Cincinnati, Ohio

== Notable members ==
- Helen Gurley Brown (Alpha Epsilon), the editor-in-chief of Cosmopolitan magazine for 32 years
- Claudette Colbert (Alpha Epsilon, honorary), actress

== See also ==
- Defunct North American collegiate sororities
- List of social sororities and women's fraternities
