= Icie Hoobler =

American biochemist

- Born: 23 July 1892
- Died: 6 January 1984 (aged 91); Gallatin
- Alma mater: Randolph College; Yale University; University of Chicago
- Occupation: Biochemist
- Awards: Garvan–Olin Medal (1946); Michigan Women's Hall of Fame (1984)
- Academic career
- Academic advisor: Lafayette Mendel

Icie Gertrude Macy Hoobler (July 23, 1892 – January 6, 1984) was an American biochemist who did research in human nutrition, specifically pertaining to mothers and children. Despite facing discrimination because of her gender, she became the first woman chair of a local section of the American Chemical Society and won 22 awards and honors for her laboratory's research.

== Early life and education ==
Hoobler grew up on a farm in Gallatin, Missouri, where she became interested in science from watching the maturation of animals and spending time roaming around her family's property. She became especially interested in children's wellness when on a trip during her childhood, where she observed sick children in poor living conditions in the mountains of Arkansas and became aroused with compassion.

Before pursuing a career in chemistry, Hoobler spent three years at the Central Female College in Lexington, Missouri at the urging of her parents, against her own wishes. At Central College, she met her first mentor, biology teacher Lily Egbert, who encouraged her to pursue science. With a new passion for science, she decided to attend the University of Chicago to major in chemistry with a minor in physics. Her advisor at University of Chicago sent her to University of Colorado at Boulder to teach inorganic chemistry.

Hoobler went on to earn her master's degree from the University of Colorado in 1918. Her first master's project was developing a more sensitive cyanide test for autopsies, which resulted in her first publication. Her second project was improving an extraction method for tungstic acid from tungsten ores. Additionally, Hoobler was a teaching assistant in the physiological chemistry course at the medical school.

Immediately after earning her master's degree, she entered a Ph.D. program at Yale University, where she studied physiological chemistry. At the time, Yale admitted a handful of female graduate students, but it was difficult for these female students to find housing near campus, as landlords discriminated against women and saw them as "bothersome." Hoobler joined the Graduate Women's Club and worked to improve living arrangements for female graduate students. Eventually, due to persuasion of the Graduate Women's Club, the university provided an on-campus living option to female students.

During a lecture on the dairy and milk industry at Yale, the professor encouraged the women in attendance to go into research on human nutrition. Hoobler became inspired and the health of mothers, infants and children became a priority in her future research.

== Career ==
After receiving her Ph.D. from Yale, she started working at Western Pennsylvania Hospital in Pittsburgh as an assistant chemist, where she faced extreme discrimination for her gender. The hospital only had restrooms for men, and Hoobler had to use a restroom in a public building a half-block down the street. Due to this, she limited her trips to the bathroom and after a few months of working at the hospital she developed acute nephritis (kidney inflammation). Because of her acute nephritis, she was urged to take a year's leave of absence. Hoobler was also not allowed to eat in the dining hall for doctors, as all the other doctors were male, and she was not allowed to eat in the nurses' dining hall for bureaucratic reasons, so she ate with the hospital employees. Upon expressing her dissatisfaction to the chief of the laboratory, she was told that she would soon get used to the conditions. After two weeks, and when the conditions did not improve, Hoobler resigned from Western Pennsylvania Hospital.

A day after her resignation, the president of the board of trustees asked her why she decided to resign and why she did not attend the annual staff banquet, which the chief of the laboratory had not invited her to because he did not think she would want to be with "all those men." After the president chastised the chief of the laboratory, Hoobler's treatment at the hospital improved to her satisfaction.

Hoobler faced numerous other instances of discrimination over the course of her career, including when the Chicago Club invited her to speak at its event, not realizing that "Icie" was a female's name. Upon arriving at the event, Hoobler was not allowed to enter until her husband negotiated with the manager and the board of trustees re-voted on whether or not to let her speak.

In 1923, during her year of rest after developing nephritis, Hoobler began teaching at the University of California, Berkeley. She taught a course on food chemistry, amongst others. While teaching, she was offered the position of director of the Nutrition Research Project of the Merril-Palmer School for Motherhood and Child Development. The project's goal was to improve knowledge and research on the health of mothers. Hoobler spent the next 31 years directing the laboratory and then served as a research consultant from 1954 to 1974. Under her direction, the laboratory published 300 journal articles and several books on subjects ranging from the metabolism of women during the reproductive cycle to the chemistry of the red blood cell.

== Honors ==
In 1931, Hoobler was selected as the first woman chair of the local section of the American Chemical Society. She received 22 citations, awards and honors over the course of her research, including the Norlin Award from the University of Colorado Boulder, the Garvan–Olin Medal from the American Chemical Society, the Borden Award from the American Home Economics Association, the Osborne Award, and the Mendel Award from the American Institute of Nutrition. She was inducted into the Michigan Women's Hall of Fame in 1984.

== Personal life ==
At the age of 46, Hoobler married Dr. Raymond Hoobler, but he died in 1943, after five years of marriage. In 1982, Hoobler returned to her birthplace in Missouri and died two years later in 1984.
