= List of Zeta Tau Alpha members =

Zeta Tau Alpha is an international women's fraternity. The following is a list of notable Zeta Tau Alpha members.

== Academia ==
- Frances St John Chappelle – assistant in psychology at the University of Nevada, Reno
- Elizabeth W. Crandall (Beta Upsilon) – professor, department chair, and dean of the College of Home Economics at the University of Rhode Island
- Rose May Davis (Phi) – chemist professor at Randolph-Macon Woman's College and Duke University
- Pearl A. Neas (Lambda) – registrar of Southwestern University and delegate to Democratic National Conventions
- Dolores Renze (Alpha Epsilon) – archivist, 21st President of the Society of American Archivists, and an editor of The American Archivist
- Beverly Whipple (Delta Epsilon) - an American sexologist, author and academic who was a professor at Rutgers University

== Art ==
- Susan Ford Bales (Alpha Upsilon) – photographer, photojournalist, spokesperson for National Breast Cancer Awareness Month, former chair of the board of the Betty Ford Center, and daughter of President Gerald Ford
- Mabel Hewit (Alpha Zeta) – woodblock print artist

== Business ==
- Deborah Platt Majoras (Delta Omega) – chairman of the Federal Trade Commission and chief legal officer and secretary of Procter and Gamble

== Entertainment ==
- Erin Andrews (Gamma Iota) – ESPN reporter and host of college football for Fox Sports
- Swayam Bhatia (Lambda Theta) - Actress, singer and multi-instrumentalist; best known for playing Vera in Zombies 4: Dawn of the Vampires and Sofi in The Mighty Ducks: Game Changers
- Betty Buckley (Gamma Psi) – Tony Award-winning theater, film, and television actress (Cats, Eight is Enough, Tender Mercies)
- MerrieBeth Cox (Alpha Theta) – 2012 Miss Indiana and finalist in 2013 Miss America pageant
- Faith Daniels (Theta) – News personality (48 Hours, Sunday Morning, The Today Show, CBS Morning News)
- Kylan Darnell (Nu) – 2022 Miss Ohio Teen USA, Top 16 Finalist and "Fan Favorite" at Miss Teen USA 2022
- Tess Ferm (Delta Psi) – Miss America's Teen 2026
- Phyllis George (Gamma Phi) – Miss America 1971, Emmy Award-winning television host, network television's first woman sportscaster, and former First Lady of Kentucky
- Gia Giudice (Theta Xi) - daughter of Real Housewives of New Jersey star Teresa Giudice; Influencer and podcaster; star of the reality TV Show Next Gen NYC
- Maggie Elizabeth Jones (Gamma Rho) – actress
- Jaiden Klein (Theta Xi) - actress, known for roles in WeCrash, Spidey and His Amazing Friends, and I Know This Much Is True
- Tiffany Maher (Eta Kappa) – runner-up on U.S. Season 9 of So You Think You Can Dance
- Jenna Morasca (Chi) – actress, swimsuit model, professional wrestler, and winner of Survivor: The Amazon
- Betty Nguyen (Kappa) – CNN journalist, anchor for CBS Morning News and contributor for The Early Show
- Nicole Paggi (Theta PNetwork actress
- Laura Rutledge – reporter and host for ESPN and SEC network and Miss Florida 2012
- Sarah Rose Summers (Gamma Psi) – Miss USA 2018
- Brittany Toll (Beta Nu) – Miss New Mexico USA, top 16 finalist at Miss USA, and Miss New Mexico Teen USA
- Stephanie Ybarra (Theta Omicron) – artistic director of Baltimore Center Stage and a co-founder of the Artists' Anti-Racism Coalition
- Ellen Taaffe Zwilich (Beta Gamma) – first woman to win the Pulitzer Prize in music and receive a doctorate in music composition from Juilliard

== Literature ==
- Cecil Dawkins (Nu) – novelist
- Jessica Ryen Doyle — published news author (Gannett) and former health editor of FOX News Channel; contemporary romance novelist

== Military ==
- Margaret A. Brewer (Alpha Gamma) – brigadier general and first woman general officer of the United States Marine Corps

== Philanthropy and nonprofit ==
- Susan Ford Bales (Alpha Upsilon) – spokesperson for National Breast Cancer Awareness Month, former chair of the board of the Betty Ford Center, photojournalist; daughter of President Gerald Ford
- Roberta Crenshaw (Kappa) – civic leader and philanthropist in Austin, Texas
- Shonda Schilling (Iota Delta) – founder of the Curt and Shonda Schilling Melanoma Foundation of America; author; wife of Boston Red Sox pitcher Curt Schilling
- Stephanie Ybarra (Theta Omicron) – co-founder of the Artists' Anti-Racism Coalition and artistic director of Baltimore Center Stage

== Politics and government ==
- Cheri Herman Daniels (Alpha Xi) – First Lady of Indiana and wife governor of Indiana Mitch Daniels
- Phyllis George (Gamma Phi) – former First Lady of Kentucky, Miss America 1971, Emmy Award-winning television host, and network television's first woman sportscaster
- Patricia Hollingsworth Holshouser – First Lady of North Carolina, Chair of the North Carolina Commission on Citizen Participation, and Member of the U.S. National Council on Economic Opportunity
- Lynda Bird Johnson Robb (Kappa) – First Lady of Virginia, chair of the Presidents Advisory Committee for Women; daughter of President Lyndon B. Johnson, and wife of Charles Robb
- Mary Shadow (Zeta) – Tennessee House of Representatives
- Virginia Shehee (Beta Iota) – Louisiana State Senate 1976–1980
- Kara Westercamp (Alpha Omicron) – Associate White House Counsel and Judge for the United States Court of International Trade

== Sports ==
- Monica Aldama (Kappa) – coach of the co-ed cheerleading team at Navarro College
- Ryan Carlyle (Beta Omicron) – member of the U.S. women's rugby sevens team at the 2016 Rio Olympics
- Maddie Gardner (Theta Tau) – two-time gold medalist at the All-Star Cheerleading World Championship
- Sarah Patterson (Nu) – head coach of the Alabama Crimson Tide women's gymnastics team

== See also ==
- List of Zeta Tau Alpha chapters
