= Eastern College (Virginia) =

American college (1902–1920)

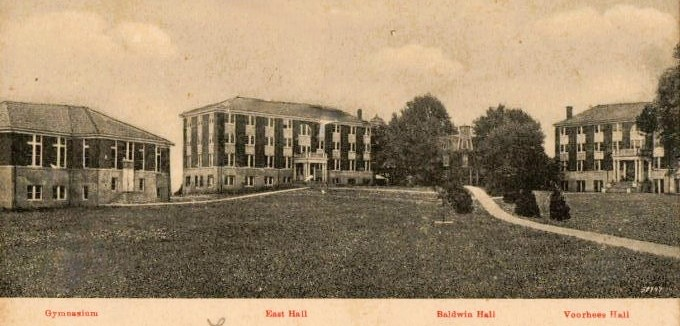
- Type: Private
- Active: 1902–1920
- Academic staff: 22
- Students: 184
- Location: Front Royal and Manassas, Virginia, United States
- Colors: Red and White

Eastern College was a coeducation school that was located in Front Royal and Manassas, Virginia. It operated from 1902 to 1920. From 1920 to 1922, the former campus housed a school for girls, also called Eastern College.

== History ==
Eastern College was established in Front Royal, Virginia in 1902. The co-educational college was non-denominational and had a no-hazing policy, On December 25, 1908, the college's lecture hall was destroyed by a fire. After the fair, college officials considered relocating. Some newspapers reported that the college was moving to Myersville, Maryland. However, the college's president and dean denied the reports, stating that this was untrue.

It relocated to Manassas, Virginia in 1909. The college borrowed funds to construct a new campus at the south end of Battle Street, while alumni and the town funded a gymnasium. While its new campus was under construction, it occupied the Baldwin House and part of the Manassas Improvement Corporation building. It also temporarily used the former Prince William Hotel as its women's dormitory. Construction was finished in 1910.

In 1912, the college had 22 faculty members. Its student enrollment was 184, with students from the local area, 22 states, and two foreign countries.

During World War I, the college's buildings were renovated and leased to the government for barracks. After the war, the buildings were returned to the college. Although the school prospered, it had signification debts. The college closed in 1920 due to low enrollment and financial challenges.. It leased its buildings to a college for young women, also called Eastern College. That school closed in 1922.

In 1923, the former campus was sold at auction and was used by the Snavely School for Boys, a college preparatory school from 1924 to 1935. The campus was then transferred to Prince William Count which planned to use it for a vocational school, before finding it unsuitable. Abandoned, the buildings were razed in 1966 after a series of fires. The former campus is now Baldwin Park and the site of the Manassas Museum.

== Campus ==
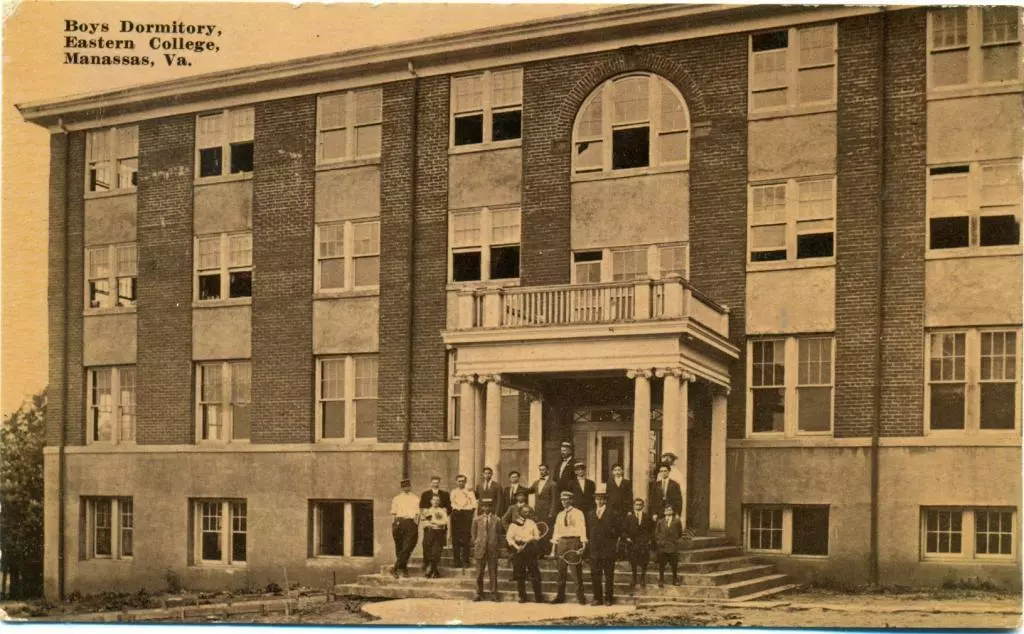
Boys Dormitory

The college's purpose-built Manassas campus was located on the grounds of the historic Baldwin House. Architect Charles M. Robinson designed two matching four-story brick and concrete buildings, called East Hall and West Hall, as well as a gymnasium for the college, The halls accommodated classrooms, dormitories, and offices. East Hall, the men's dormitory, was completed in June 1909. West Hall, also called Vorhees Hall, was the women's dormitory; it was completed in June 1910, followed by the gymnasium in July 1910. The dormitories included single rooms, double rooms, and suites. The bathrooms had hot and cold running water and showers.

The music department was housed in Baldwin House. This pre-existing structure was built in 1890 and had previously housed five other schools.

== Academics ==
Eastern College awarded a Bachelor of Pedagogy and a Bachelor of Literature (Lit.B.). The college offered preparatory, college, junior college, finishing school, and business curriculums. ts courses were grouped into groups for agriculture/home economics, chemistry/biology, history/political science, modern language, music, and philosophical-pedagogical, It also provided classes in the arts, drawing, elocution, and music.

Before enrolling, students were required to have completed a wide range of coursework, including high school and musical courses.

== Student activities ==
Eastern College had a College Christian Association, chapters of Eta Upsilon Gamma and Sigma Iota Chi sororities, and two literary societies—the Washington Irving and the Jeffersonian. Campus life included student debates and music recitals.

== Athletics ==
The college's colors were red and white.

Its male students participated in baseball and football while at the Front Royal campus, playing against Augusta Military Academy, Charleston (WV), and Washington and Lee College. At Manassas, the football team played Augusta Military, Blue Ridge (MD), George Washington University, Gallaudet College, Georgetown University, the Manassas Football Club, Maryland Agricultural College, Mount Saint Mary's College and Seminary, Randolph–Macon College, the Richmond Athletic Club, St. John's College, Shenandoah Military Academy, Virginia Military Institute, and Western Maryland. However, the football program was dropped from 1910 to 1915. After reforming, the football team was undefeated in the 1921 season.

Baseball was Eastern College's "signature sport". Its team played a 25-game schedule against colleges in Maryland, Virginia, and Washington D.C., as well as Fordham University and the University of Pennsylvania.

There was also a women's basketball team by 1905.

== See also ==
- List of colleges and universities in Virginia
