= Central Female College =

Women's college in Lexington, Missouri, US (1869–1924)

Coordinates: 39.18237°N 93.88837°W

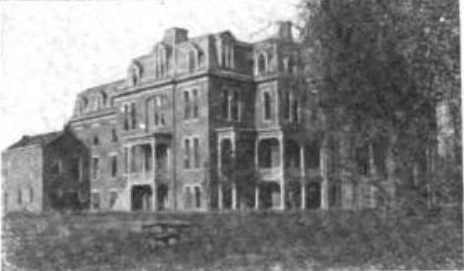
- Central Female College, 1904
- Other names: Central College for Women
- Former names: Marvin Female Institute
- Type: Private
- Active: 1869–1925
- Religious affiliation: Methodist Episcopal Church, South
- Location: Lexington, Missouri, United States

Central Female College (also known as Marvin Female Institute and Central College for Women) was a women's college located in Lexington, Missouri, United States. The institution was associated with the Methodist Episcopal Church, South. It operated from 1869 to 1924.

== History ==
The Marvin Female Institute was founded in Lexington, Missouri in 1869. It operated by three conferences of the Methodist Episcopal Church, South and was named in honor of Bishop Enoch Mather Marvin. Its original location was in a building on South 6th Street. Its president for the first year was William F. Camp, pastor of the Methodist church in Lexington. He was replaced by J. O. Church of Columbia, Tennessee for the 1870 to 1871 year.

In December 1870, the Grand Lodge of the Missouri Masons gave the institute the former Masonic College building and five acres worth $20,000 ($509,211 in today's money). The institution moved to the former Masonic College in 1871. The Masons made the donation with the understanding that some $50,000 would be invested in buildings and improvements to the campus. The building was renovated and the student's rooms were carpeted and furnished.

At the October 1871 Methodist Episcopal Church conference, the institute's name was changed to Central Female College. Later, it was called the Central College for Women.

In 1904, the college had 135 students and eighteen teachers and officers. In March 1925, the three Methodist conferences announced plans to relocate Central College for Women to provide a larger campus with a Class A rating. If college was not relocated, its assets were to be liquidated and used for women's education in Missouri. In mid-March 1925, Kansas City announced its interest in becoming the new home for the college. In April, a million dollar fund was planned for the move to Kansas City, along with arrangements for the donation of 100 acres. At the end of the spring 1925 semester, the Central College for Women closed.

After closing, its property in Lexington was acquired by Central College, now Central Methodist University in Fayette, Missouri. It included three main buildings: an administration building, a dormitory, and a classroom/auditorium building.

== Academics ==
Its first year, the college offered classes in algebra, arithmetic, grammar, Latin, mechanical philosophy, moral philosophy, music instruments, physiology and hygiene, rhetoric, trigonometry, and vocal music.

== Student life ==
The college had several Greek letter organizations, including Beta Sigma Omicron, Phi Theta Kappa, Eta Upsilon Gamma and Sigma Iota Chi. It was one of seven women's colleges in Missouri that were the original members of Phi Theta Kappa, the international honor society for two-year colleges and programs.

== Notable people ==
=== Alumnae ===
- Icie Hoobler, biochemist
- Esther McCoy, author and architectural historian

=== Presidents ===
- William F. Camp, 1869 to 1870
- J. O. Church, 1870 to January 1872
- Abram Davenport, January to April 1872 interim
- W. T. J. Sullivan, May 1872 to 1876
- M. G. McIlhaney, 1876 to 1878
- Wesley G. Miller, 1878 to 1879
- William F. Kerdolff Jr., 1879 to 1888
- A. A. Jones, 1888
- Zachariah M. Williams

== See also ==
- List of colleges and universities in Missouri
- List of current and historical women's universities and colleges in the United States
