= Pleasant J. Potter College =

Women's college in Bowling Green, Kentucky, US

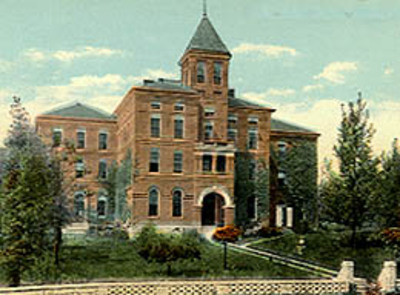
- Former name: Pleasant J. Potter College for Young Ladies
- Type: Private, women's
- Active: September 9, 1889–May 20, 1909
- President: Benjamin F. Cabell
- Location: Bowling Green, Kentucky, United States
- Colors: Green and Gold

Pleasant J. Potter College was an American private women's college that operated from 1889 to 1909 in Bowling Green, Kentucky.

== History ==
In early 1884, a group of businessmen in Bowling Green, Kentucky formed a committee to establish a girls' school for local and boarding students. Benjamin F. Cabell was elected president of the proposed school; he had taught at the Cedar Bluff College in Kentucky until that institution was destroyed by fire. Cabell began planning and fundraising for the new college.

The school committee purchased a 4-acre tract known as Vinegar Hill on the southern edge of Bowling Green in March 1889. Cabell and the committee sold subscriptions to the local community for $25 a share to fund a "state of the art" building. This scheme raised $17,000 but was short of the needed funds for the construction project. Local businessman and banker Pleasant J. Potter donated the last $5,000 ($179,167 in today's money) required for construction.

Pleasant J. Potter College was incorporated on February 9, 1889, with $21,160 set aside to construct its main building. It was named for Potter in recognition of his donation. Otis Wood of Louisiana was hired to construct the building; the construction workers were paid with shares in the building stock.

Pleasant J. Potter College for Young Ladies opened on September 9, 1889. Because the building was not completed until December, boarding students were housed in town. Its students consisted of female students of "high position". Cabell was the college's president.

Potter College operated on what was considered an out-of-date congregate system with a single building. This allowed the school's administrators to control the students, including locking them on their floors at night. In contrast to more modern colleges of the era that gave female students more freedom, the students at Potter College "chafed at a succession of rules, bells, and institutional constraints". Even its faculty petitioned to ease their duties as chaperons to the students.

In 1901, Cabell caught local boys helping five students exit the second floor via a ladder for a late-night date. Gunfire was exchanged between Cabell and the boys, but there were no injuries. The female students were expelled. Despite the college's attempt to reduce scandal, the incident made national news.

Cabell moved into a separate house next to the school building in 1907. However, his health declined, and the college suffered from financial difficulties as students went to other, more modern colleges. Cabell closed Potter College after the spring 1909 term, on May 20.

Western Kentucky State Normal School bought the buildings, properties, and adjacent 177 acres of Potter College in 1909 for $82,500. In February 1911, Western relocated to the former Potter campus. In the 1930s, the Potter College building was demolished. Potter College alumnae became affiliates of Western's alumni association in 1930.

== Campus ==
Potter College was located at the summit of Vinegar Hill (also called Copley Knob), 125 feet (38 m) above downtown Bowling Green. The four-story Italianate style college building was designed by Louisville architect Harry P. McDonald. The building featured two wings; a third wing was added in 1890. Its first floor included a chapel, classrooms, a dining room, a kitchen, a library, and reception rooms. The second and third stories had a gymnasium, a music room, and 100 furnished bedrooms that housed two students each. The building had modern conveniences; it was heated by steam, illuminated by gas light, and its nine bathrooms had hot and cold running water. The college president and his wife also lived in the building until a nearby house was acquired in 1907.

== Academics ==
Potter College operated as a finishing school for upper-class girls but also provided a liberal arts education that prepared its students for work as artists, businesswomen, nurses, social reformers, teachers, and writers. Its students graduated with Bachelor of Arts, Mistress of English language, or a Certificate of Proficiency. The latter required "satisfactory completion" of coursework in elocution, English, French, German, Latin, math, music, and science.

Cabell developed a curriculum focused on English studies, mathematics, and science. Students studied a mix of classical and more recent writings, including Geoffrey Chaucer, Cicero, Nathaniel Hawthorne, William Shakespeare, and Virgil. Science offerings include botany, chemistry, physics, and zoology. Other required courses included history, logic, and political economy. Over time, religious studies, elocution, political geography, and spelling were added to the college's curriculum. Students could also take electives, including art, languages, and music.

== Student life ==
Students at Potter College were required to attend chapel daily; on Sundays, they attended the local church selected by their parents.

One of the college's first clubs was the Young Women's Christian Association. Other clubs were organized around the students' state residence, such as Kentucky, Tennessee, or Texas. Two literary societies, Hypatian and Ossolian, were also established, as well as French, German, and Shakespeare Clubs.

Potter College had social sororities, including chapters of Beta Sigma Omicron (1902), Sigma Iota Chi (1909) Eta Upsilon Gamma (1908) and Phi Mu Gamma (1908). All four chapters went defunct in 1909 when the college closed. The sororities established rooms in the school building.

The students formed intramural athletic teams for basketball, bowling, and tennis. The students also published The Green and Gold on a quarterly basis.

== See also ==
- Women's colleges in the United States
- List of women's universities and colleges in the United States
