= Forest Park University =

Defunct U.S. women's college (1861–1925)

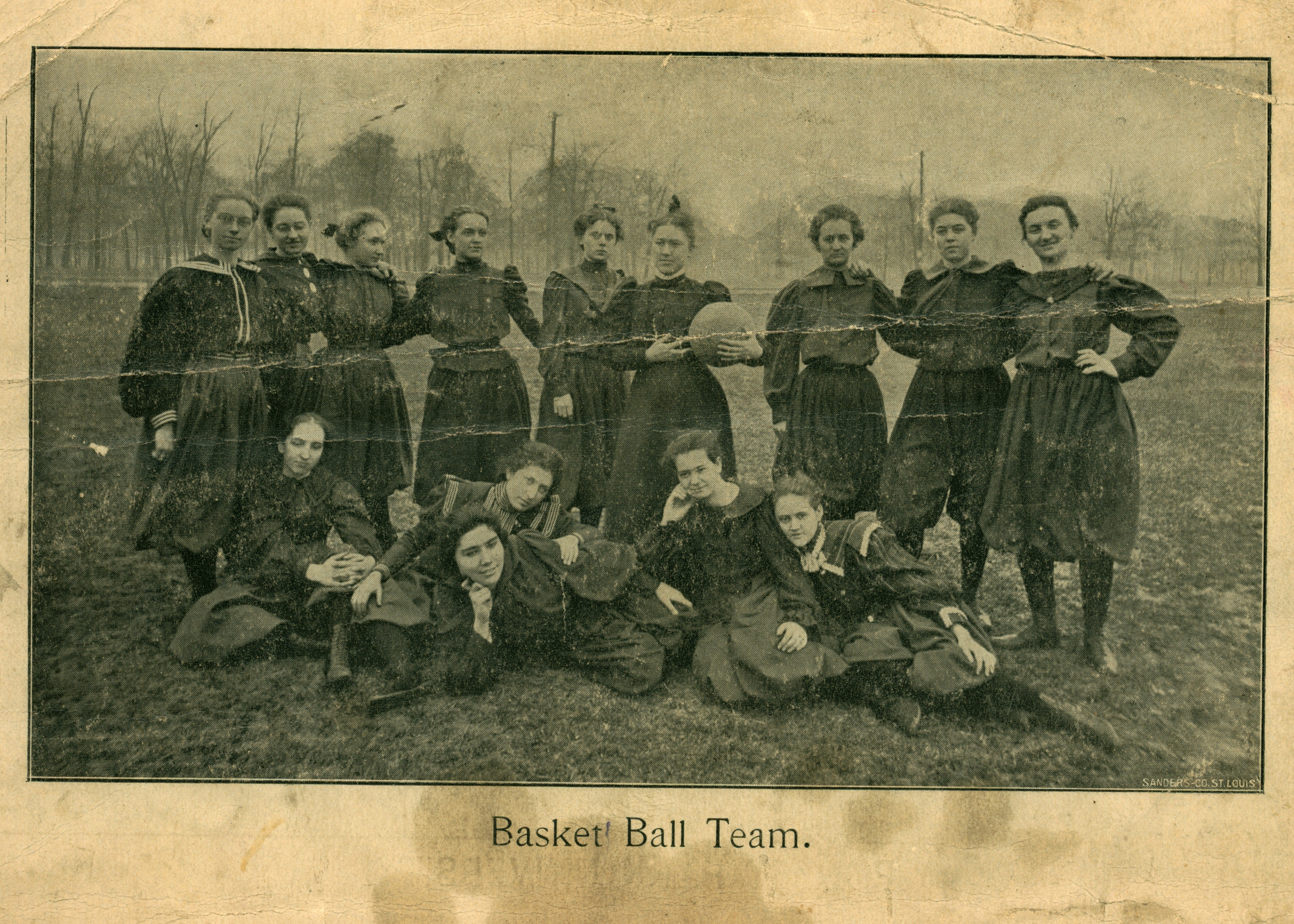
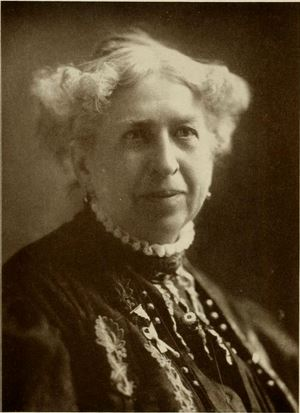
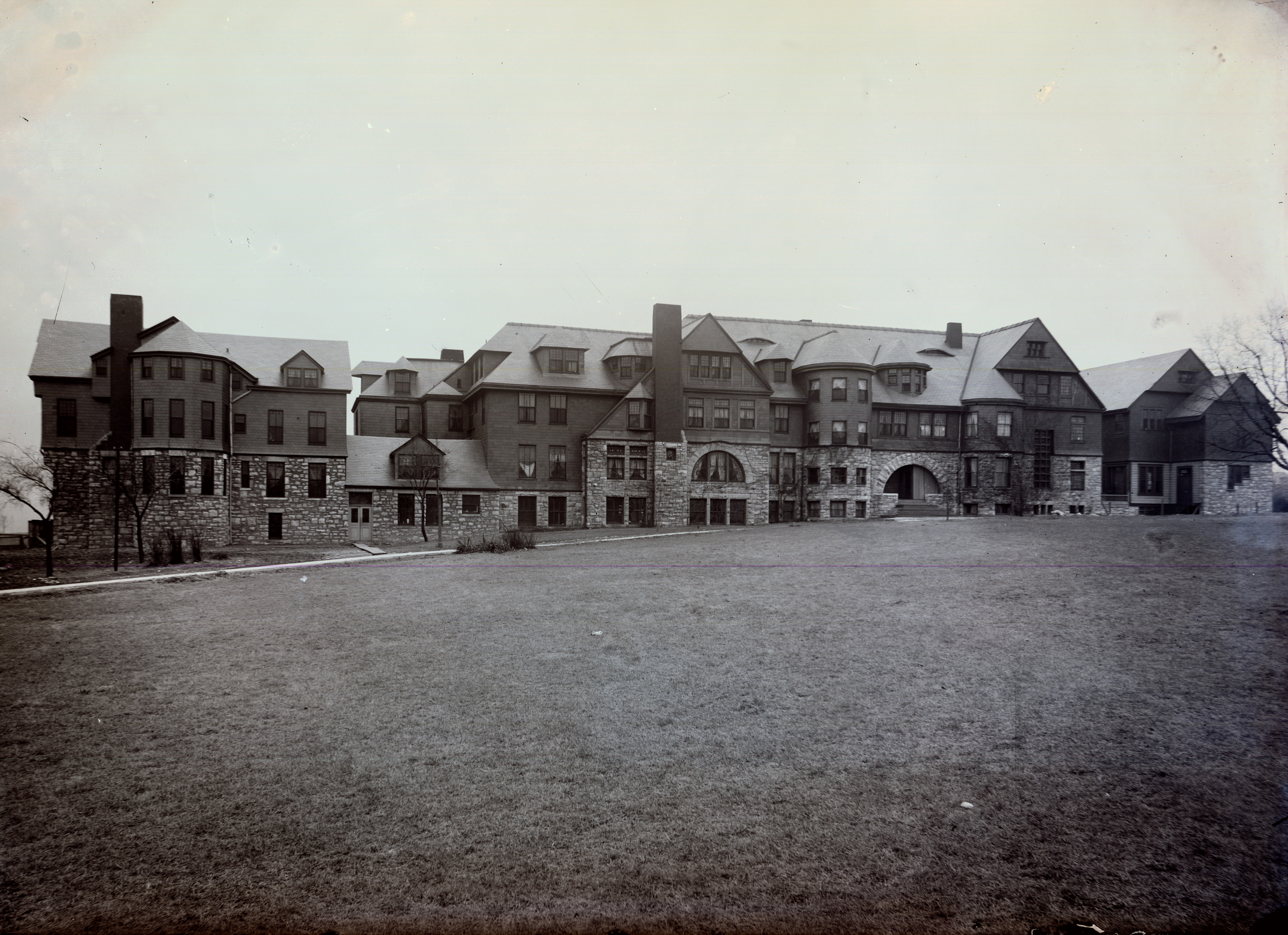
Forest Park University basketball team, 1900; portrait of founder Anna Sneed Cairns; Forest Park University main building

Forest Park University for Women, originally Kirkwood School and then Kirkwood Seminary, sometimes Forest Park College, was a female college that operated in the greater St. Louis area of Missouri, United States from 1861 until 1925. The school was founded and led by educator and activist Anna Sneed Cairns for the entirety of its existence. She and her sister Mary Sneed established the school in a rented room during the American Civil War, with seven little girls as their students. Kirkwood Seminary was incorporated in 1868. The school later moved to a two-room building, and then "an imposing stone building." Kirkwood Seminary's final location was on Webster Avenue in Kirkwood, Missouri. The seminary became four-year college in 1886.

The school moved to a new, larger building, on Clayton Road south of Forest Park, in 1891. Cairns renamed the institution to Forest Park University in 1893. By 1911 the school claimed more than 5,000 alumnae. The school closed in 1925. The building was sold off in 1926.
