= Dodd College =

Women's college in Shreveport, Louisiana, US (1927–1942)

- Dodd College President's Home
- U.S. National Register of Historic Places
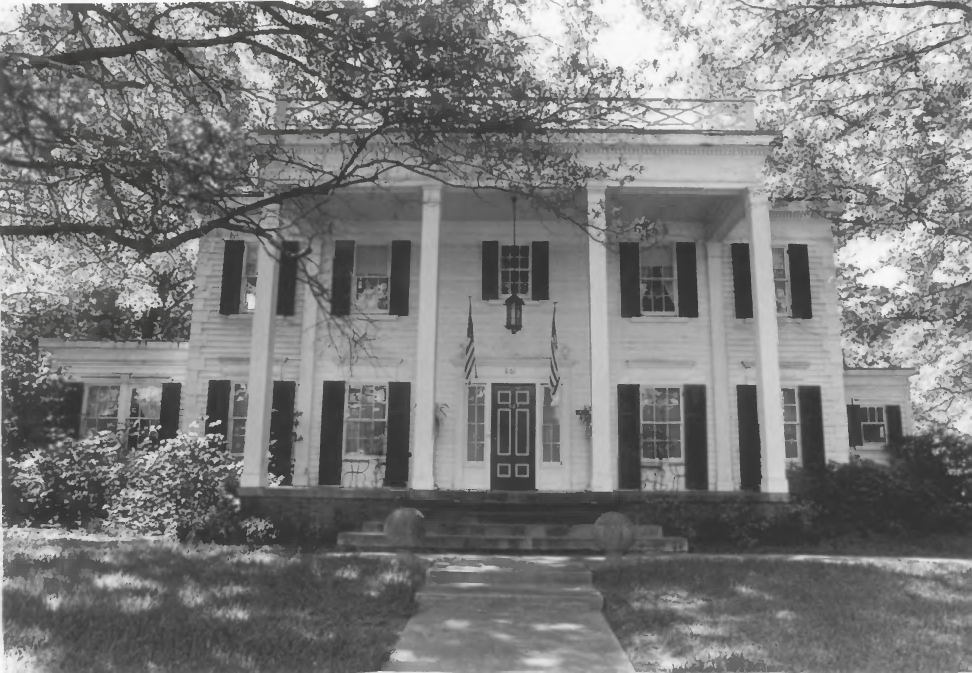

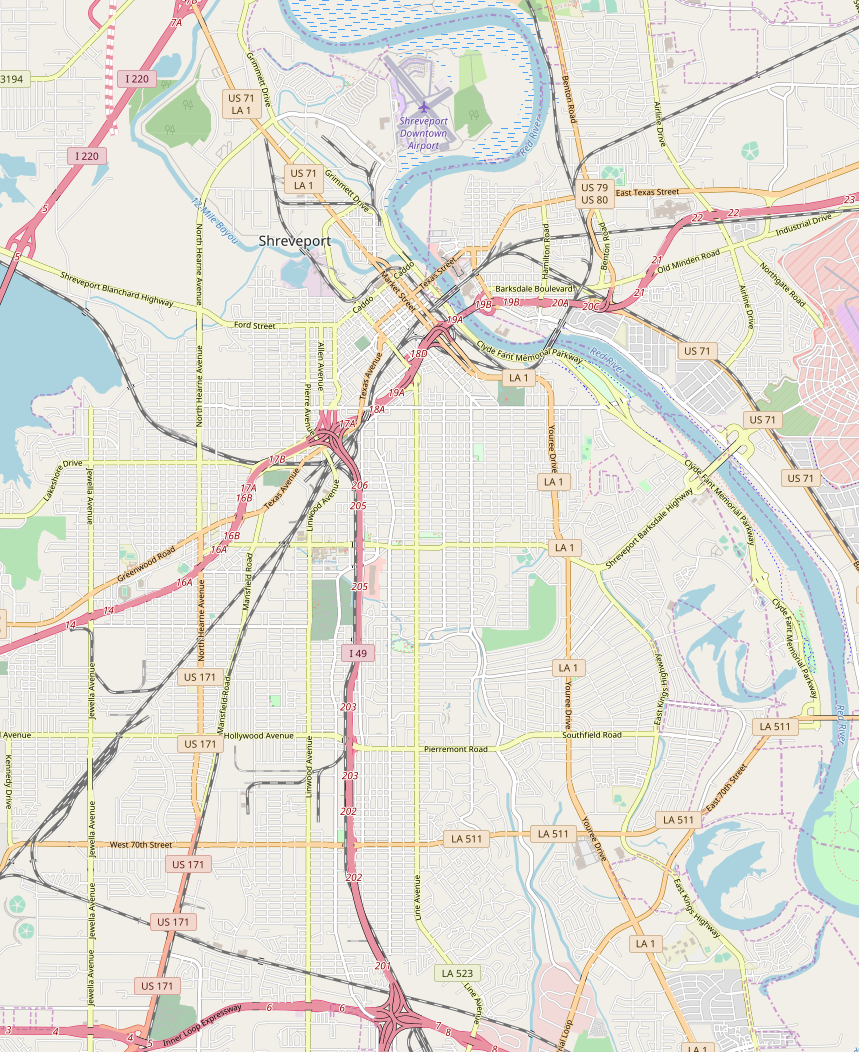
- Location within Shreveport
- Location: 601 Ockley Drive, Shreveport, Louisiana
- Coordinates: 32°28′07″N 93°44′32″W
- Built: 1928
- Architect: Clarence W. King
- Architectural style: Colonial Revival
- NRHP reference No.: 82002758
- Added to NRHP: July 22, 1982

Dodd College was a private junior college for women located in Shreveport, Louisiana. It was founded in 1927 by Monroe E. Dodd, a radio preacher who headed the Southern Baptist Convention from 1934 to 1935. Dodd College closed in 1942. The college had a chapter of Sigma Iota Chi sorority.

Among the chairmen of the trustees was W. Scott Wilkinson, a Shreveport lawyer who served in the state House from 1920 to 1924.
