= Zwilgmeyer =

Zwilgmeyer is a surname. Notable people with this surname include:

- Dagfinn Zwilgmeyer (1900 – 1979), a Norwegian priest and psalmist
- Dikken Zwilgmeyer (1853 – 1913), a Norwegian writer
- Peter Gustav Zwilgmeyer (1813 – 1887), a Norwegian politician
