= Kate Sara Chittenden =

American musician and educator (1856–1949)

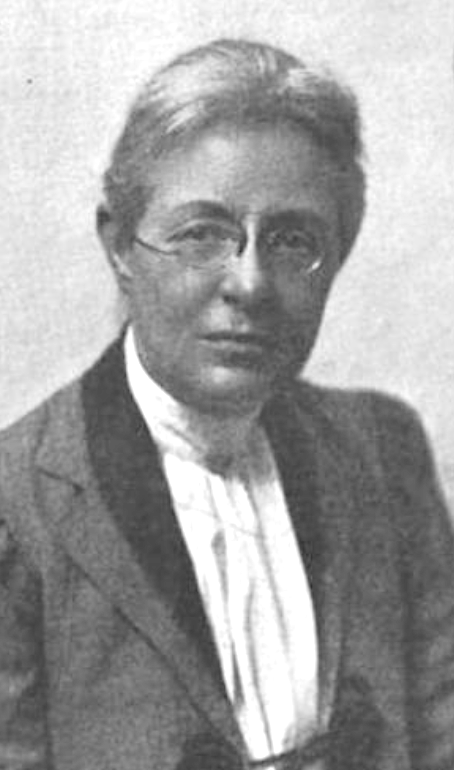
- Kate Sara Chittenden, from a 1915 publication
- Born: 17 April 1856; Hamilton, Canada West
- Died: September 16, 1949 (aged 93); New York City
- Occupation(s): Music school dean, music educator, pianist

Kate Sara Chittenden (17 April 1856 – 16 September 1949) was an American professor of music, music school founder, and piano teacher.

== Early life and education ==
Chittenden was born in Hamilton, Canada West, the daughter of Curtis Strong Chittenden and Caroline Young Peterson Chittenden. Her parents were American; her father was a dentist born in Shelburne, Vermont. One of her paternal ancestors, William Chittenden (1593–1660), was one of six founders of Guilford, Connecticut, in 1639. Another ancestor, Thomas Chittenden (1730–1797), was the first Governor of Vermont. Her cousin Charles Curtis Chittenden was president of the American Dental Association.

She studied piano with an aunt from age 5, then with Jules Fossier and Lucy H. Clinton. She was awarded the Dufferin Medal for Art in 1873, while she was a student at Hellmuth Ladies' College, London, Ontario. Chittenden later studied with Lucy Nelson and Albert Ross Parsons.

== Career ==
Chittenden taught at her alma mater, Hellmuth Ladies' College, after graduation. She moved to New York in 1876, to work with Lucy Nelson. Chittenden was organist and choir director at Calvary Baptist Church in New York City from 1879 to 1906. In 1906, she became a founding member of the American Guild of Organists and a charter member of the MacDowell Club.

Chittenden is known for originating a form of piano instruction known as synthetic piano method. She served as the founding dean of the American Institute of Applied Music in New York City, from 1900 to 1932. She was head of the piano department at Vassar College from 1899 to 1930, and upon retirement was awarded professor emeritus status. Newspapers also name her as the first woman lecturer employed by the Board of Education for New York City Schools, serving from 1892 to 1919. She was head of piano department at Catherine Aiken School in Stamford, Connecticut, from 1890 to 1914. In 1883 she became a life member of the Music Teachers National Association. In 1889, she became founder and director of music department in Hartley House Settlement, later incorporated as Hartley House Music School. From 1899 to 1903, she was head of the piano department at Putnam Hall School in Poughkeepsie.

Chittenden's students included Paul Ambrose (Canadian conductor, composer and organist), Mable Madison Watson (composer and music educator), and June Weybright (composer and music educator). Annabel Wood Mansfield, a music teacher in Atlanta, was Chittenden's protegee and successor at the Hartley House Settlement. Chittenden published Tetrad arpeggios: Dominant and diminished seventh (1926), a piano exercise book.

== Personal life ==
Chittenden died in 1949, at the age of 93, at her home in New York City.
