= Mabel Madison Watson =

American composer

Mabel Madison Watson (December 16, 1872 – September 12, 1952) was an American composer who taught piano and violin students. She was born in Elizabeth, New Jersey, to James Madison Watson and Emma Hopper Watson. Her father wrote several school textbooks, and children's author Emilie Poulsson lived with the Watson family during Mabel's childhood.

Watson graduated from the Metropolitan College of Music in New York. She studied music with Kate Sara Chittenden, Herbert Greene, Albert Rosa Parsons, Harry Rowe Shelley, and Otto Meyer in America; and with Oscar Raif in Berlin and Isidor Philipp in Paris.

Watson concentrated on teaching beginning piano and violin students. She published at least one article in the journal Kindergarten Review: Music as an Element in Aesthetic Training. She was known for having beginning piano students use both hands and learn both treble and bass clefs right from the beginning, while most teachers started students using only one hand and one clef. She initially maintained studios in New York City and Philadelphia, but eventually closed the New York City studio and focused on her work in Philadelphia.

In 1920 and 1921, Watson directed the Keene Valley Summer Music Colony (or School) in the Adirondack mountains, with assistance from violinist Otto Meyer, her former teacher. It was a three month class for instruction in composition, piano, theory, and violin.

Watson was a member of the American String Teachers Association. Her music was published by Theodore Presser Co., Arthur P. Schmidt, and G. Schirmer, Inc. Her compositions include:

== Piano ==
- Alpenrose Waits
- Birthday Party Waltz
- Children's Party
- Christmas Tree (Christmas Morning)
- Dance of the Snowflakes
- Desert Caravan
- First Visits to Tuneland: A Collection of Rhymes and Tunes to Teach the Notes Up and Down from Middle C
- Five tuneful sketches for piano
- Flight of Swallows
- Folk Dance
- Games and Toys
- Heath and Hall
- Junior High Entrance March
- Little One Sleep!
- Little Tales from Tuneland: 34 Simple Tunes with Rhymes
- Little Two Voice Songs and Dances
- March of the Merry Men (Christmas Night)
- March of the Tin Cavalry
- Marionette Ballet
- Merry, Merry March
- Mummer's Parade
- Night in Venice
- On Skis
- Out of Doors: Six Characteristic Pieces for Piano
- Pirates Bold
- Playing in the Snow (Christmas Afternoon)
- Rubber Doll's Dance
- Scenes from Tuneland
- Seven Scenes from Childhood
- Snow for Christmas (Christmas Eve)
- Song of Sleep and Snow (The Night Before Christmas)
- Summertime Stories
- Tally Ho
- Trotting Pony
- Twelve Magic Keys: 40 Pieces in all the Major Keys
- Warp and Woof: Eleven little Tunes & Rhymes for Independent Part Playing

== Violin ==
- Bel Canto Method (an elementary violin method)
- First Folk Songs (violin and piano)
- Five Dances in Ancient Style (violin, cello and piano)
