= Hellmuth Ladies' College =

Canadian private college for women

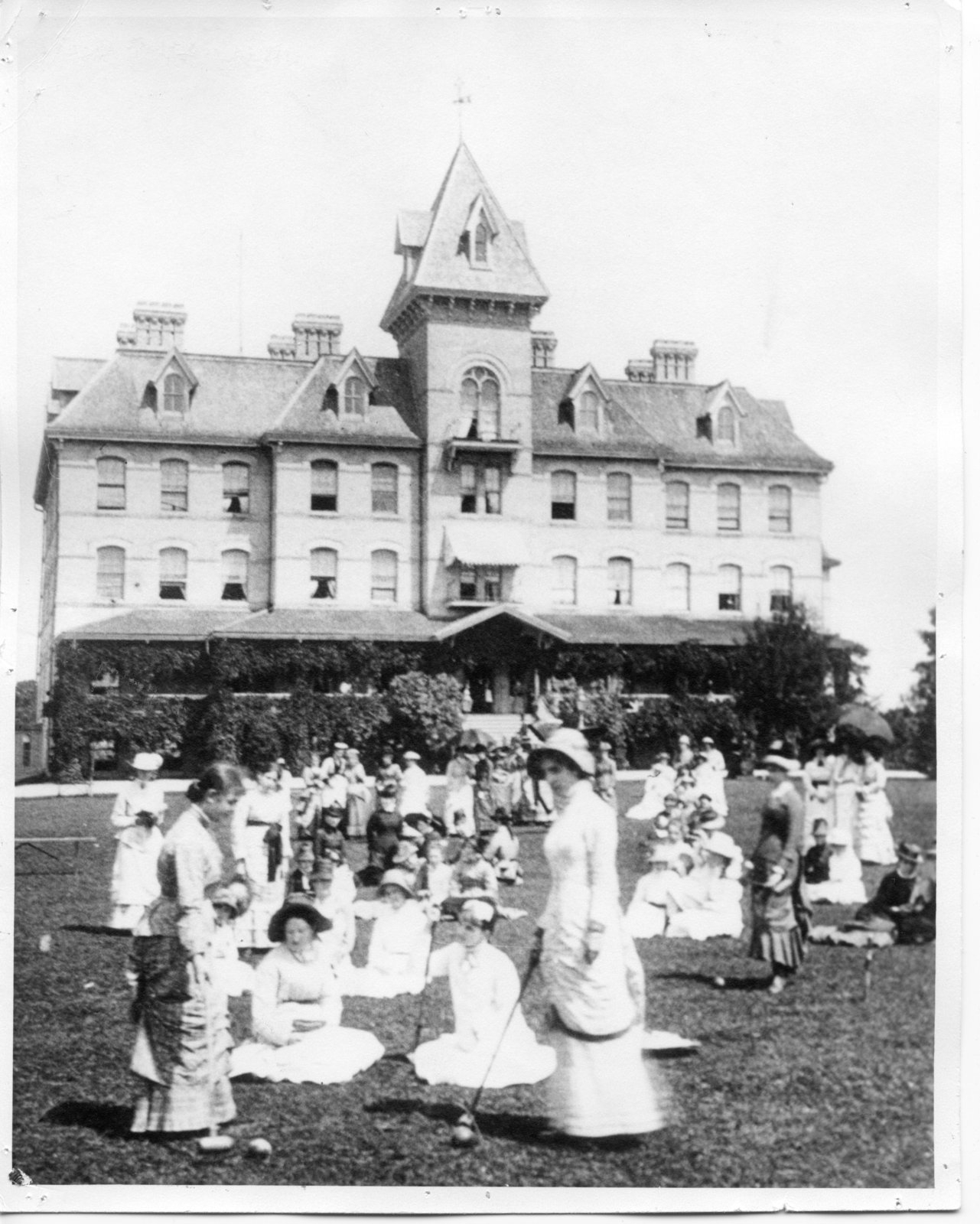
- Hellmuth Ladies' College (c. 1895); Courtesy of The Ivey Family London Room (genealogy), London Public Library, London, Ontario
- Motto: Get Wisdom
- Type: Private
- Active: 1869–1899
- Affiliations: Anglican Church of Canada; Diocese of Huron
- President: Right Rev. Isaac Hellmuth (1819–1901); Rev. Theodore Irving, LL.D. (1809–1880) (Note: Rev. Theodore Irving, LL.D. (1809–1880) was a nephew of Washington Irving ("Washington Irving's Nephew," New York Times, December 21, 1880).)
- Principal: Rev. Edward Noble English (1851–1918); Rev. Henry Faulkner Darnell (1831–1915)
- Location: London, Ontario, Canada
- Mascot: Beaver

Hellmuth Ladies' College (founded September 1869; closed 1899–1901) was a private college for women in London, Ontario. The college was founded by Reverend Isaac Hellmuth and was inaugurated by Prince Arthur. The college had no official connection with a church; but under the patronage of its founder and namesake, it was thoroughly Anglican. Princess Louise became its patroness on her visit in 1878. The college was devoted to the study of arts and sciences. It was located on Richmond Street North, just south of Windermere Road on the hill overlooking the Thames River. Hellmuth Ladies' College was complemented by Hellmuth College — for young men, founded 1865 — also of London, Ontario. Hellmuth Ladies' College closed sometime between 1899 and 1901. The properties were acquired by the Sisters of St. Joseph and transformed into Mount St. Joseph Orphanage.

== Property ==
The land

In 1867, Isaac Hellmuth purchased 150 acres with a hill overlooking the Thames River, and commissioned the design and construction of Hellmuth Ladies’ College.

The main building

The main building was designed by Gundry & Langley, a Toronto-based architectural firm headed by Thomas Gundry (1830–1869) and Henry Langley (1836–1907). Since the closing of the college in 1899, the building served as a convent and orphanage. It stood until 1976, when it was demolished. Mount St. Joseph Academy for girls continued in that location until 1985. As of 2011, the building and its grounds are the official home of Windermere On The Mount, a retirement residence operated by Revera.

The main building took on a new role in 1899, when it was purchased by the Sisters of St. Joseph, a Roman Catholic order of sisters dedicated to caring for orphans and the elderly, educating young girls, and ministering to the poor. Under its new name, Mount St. Joseph Mother House, the building and property served as both an orphanage and a convent for the sisters.

The chapel

Isaac Hellmuth erected a small chapel, just a short walk from the main building, and named it St. Anne's Chapel, in honor of the then Lady Principal, Anne Mills.

Norwood House

Residence of Bishop Hellmuth.

== Diplomas, certificates, medals ==
Hellmuth Ladies' College conferred diplomas, certificates of standing, and medals. Silver medals were awarded for general proficiency; silver and gold medals were awarded for proficiency in special subjects, including divinity, mathematics, science, and languages.

== Administration and selected faculty ==
Principals
- 1869–1872: Ann Mills (1810–1898) – Principal
- 1872–187?: Rev. Irwin – Principal
- 1872–1874: Rev. Ganon, B.S. Huntingdon, M.A. – Principal
- 1874–1883: Rev. Henry Faulkner Darnell (1831–1915) – Principal
- 1883–1899: Rev. Edward Noble English (1851–1918) – Principal
- 1878–1880: Rev. James Johnson Hill, M.A. (1832–1896) – Resident Principal and Chaplain for 18 months, beginning around the middle of 1878
- 1870: Major Evans
Lady Principals
- 1875–1882: Lucy Hannah Clinton (1846–1932) – Lady Principal
- 1872–187?: Mrs. Irwin – Lady Principal
Lady Superintendents
- 1875: Lucy Hannah Clinton (1846–1932)
- 1877: Miss McLellan
- 1882: Miss H.G. Wight, Diploma of Cambridge, England
Literary Department
- Rev. Edward Noble English, M.A. (1851–1918) – professor of mental philosophy and physics
- Rev. J. S. Thomas, M.A. – professor of classical and English Literature
- Rev. Charles B. Guillemont, B.A., D.D., Ph.D. (1828–1910) – professor of modern languages
- 1879–1880: Rev. William Minter Seaborne (1828–1913) – professor of natural sciences
- The Rev. George Bloomfield Sage, B.A., B.D. (1856–1938) (Note: George Bloomfield Sage (1856–1938) was married 1884 to Jessica Olivia English (1860–1938), a half-sister of Rev. Edward Noble English.) – Classics and Mathematics
- 1889–1896: Miss Martha H. H. Wray (1862–1947) (Note: Martha Holmes Hamilton Wray (1862–1947); 1896 marriage to Nathaniel Hobson (1846–1929).) – teacher of German, English, and mathematics
- Miss Henrietta B. English (1864–1946) (Note: Henrietta B. English (1864–1946) was a half-sister of Rev. Edward Noble English.) – English Subjects
Academic subjects
- Miss E. Henstridge
Music Department
- 1883–1888: William Caven Barron, Esq. (1864–1936) – professor of piano, organ, and music history
- 1883–1885: William Waugh Lauder (1857–1931) – musical director, professor of piano, music theory, and music history
- 1885–1899: Thomas W. Martin, Esq. (1861–1943) – musical director, professor of piano, harmony, and music history
- Miss Nelda J. Von Seyfried (born 1856) – professor of singing
- Roselle Pococke, Esq. (1859–1925) – professor of violin
- 1889–1899: Waldemar Arthur Blüthner, Esq. (1862–19??) – professor of piano and harmony
- Stinson W. Wilson – professor of organ
- Madame Hausch – professor of violin
- Miss. K. Moore – professor of singing and organ
- 1874–1876: Kate Sara Chittenden (1856–1949) – professor of piano
- 1870–188?: Lucy Hannah Clinton (1846–1932) – musical directress (1881), professor of piano, (Note: Lucy Hannah Clinton (1846–1932) had studied piano with Clara Schumann and held certificates from William Sterndale Bennett and Cipriani Potter.) Lady Superintendent in 1875, Music Directress in 1877
- Miss Anna M. Diller (born 1868; married Edwin D. Starbuck) – teacher of piano
- Ida Louisa English (1869–1937), (Note: Ida Louisa English was a half-sister of Edward Noble English.) 1900 marriage to Corvin Weld (1868–1942) – professor of piano, organ, and Italian
- Miss M. Raymond – piano
- 1869: Frances Josephine Hatton (1840–1906), 1871 marriage to Charles Greenwood Moore, MD (1818–1886) – composer, professor of composition and singing (daughter of English composer John Liptrot Hatton)
Art Department
- 1883–1892: Julian Ruggles Seavey, Esq. (1857–1940) – director and professor of painting, modelling, carving, decorative art, and design
- Miss E. Burwell – Drawing and Crayon
- Miss L. A. M. Jones – Modelling, Carving, and Decorative Art
- Martha Justina Hardwick (née Thomas; 1854–1917), 1874 marriage to William James Anderson (died 1887), 1887 marriage to John Wesley Hardwick (1855–1923)
- Mrs. A. Kenly, Art Needlework
- mid-1870s: William Lees Judson (1842–1928), drawing and painting
- Caroline Farncomb (1859–1951) – painting
Elocution Department
- Rev. Edward Noble English, M.A. (1851–1918) – Director
- 1889–1894: Elizabeth (Libby) Alberta Oakley, B.L. (1862–1961), 1903 marriage to Walter E. Chrysler
Business Department
- William Charles Coo (1861–1950) – professor of shorthand
Etiquette Department, Physical Culture, Hygiene, etc.
- Mary Stoughton English (née Mulkins; born 1851), wife of Rev. Edward Noble English – Director
- Friend Richard Eccles, M.D. (who lived from 1843–1924) – Sanitary Science
Ladies' Drill, Department
- C. Major Darnley – Department and Family
- G. B. Dayton – Dancing
- 1884–1999: John Fulcher (born 1850) – Riding and Driving
Miscellaneous faculty
- Frances "Fanny" Barbara Moule (1850–1917), 1880 marriage to professor James Edward Wells, M.A., LL.D. (1838–1898); 1904 marriage to Rev. Oates Charles Symonds Wallace (1856–1947)
- Edith Fitzgerald (née Edith Mary Jones; 1844–1928), 1864 marriage to Frederick Ardiel Fitzgerald (1840–1924)
- Constance Meredith (1865–1967), daughter of William Ralph Meredith, wife of George Armstrong Peters Archived 2016-03-03 at the Wayback Machine
- Maude Cloudman Hudson, married to William Hamilton Merritt, Esq., M.D., C.M., R.C.P.S., Edin (1865–1924)
- Buzzie Gurd (aka Laurie Buzzel Gurd, née Phoebe Buzzel Gurd; 1872–1895)
- Miss Hattie English

== Notable alumnae ==
- Victoria Grace Blackburn (1865–1928), journalist and author
- Kate Sara Chittenden (1856–1949), professor of music; received the Dufferin Bronze Medal for Art in 1873, (Note: Dufferin Medals were the forerunner to Governor General's Awards. They were introduced in 1874 by the Earl of Dufferin, Canada's third Governor-General who served from 1872 to 1878, as an award to students for academic or athletic excellence ("The Dufferin Medal," by Stuart P. Kenning, The Canadian Numismatic Journal, Vol. 9, No. 7, July 1964, pps. 287–288; OCLC 0008-4573).)
- Evelyn Johnson (1856–1937), poet (Note: Evelyn Johnson was as sister of Pauline Johnson, a 19th century writer.)
- Maggie Langdell (née Margaret Ellen Huson; 1856–1907), 1875 diploma from Hellmuth, 1880 marriage to Christopher Columbus Langdell (1826–1926), Dean of Harvard Law School
- Madge Macbeth (née Madge Hamilton Lyons; 1881–1965), author and first woman president of the Canadian Authors Association
- Marian Osborne (née Marian Georgina Francis; 1871–1931), poet
- Anna Diller Starbuck (1868–1929), professor of music

== Publications ==
- The Hellmuth World, the newspaper of Hellmuth Ladies' College

Notable contributors:

- Louise Amelia Knapp Smith Clappe (1819–1906)
1. "Our Summer In The Valley of the Moon," successive issues, beginning May 28, 1881; OCLC 58856350
2. "The Lennox Library," April 2, 1881
3. "Unconscious Plagiarisms," June 18, 1881

== Student organizations ==
Chi Omega, a U.S. based sorority, chartered its Phi chapter at Hellmuth Ladies' College in 1899. Its one-year presence at Hellmuth stands as Chi Omega's only international expansion in the sorority's one hundred and forty-one years of existence. and Hellmuth's only Greek sorority.

== Bibliography ==
=== Sources ===
- Canadian Almanac and Repository of Useful Knowledge. Toronto: The Copp, Clark Company (Limited). ISSN 0319-1230 (print), ISSN 0319-1230 (online), ISSN 9002-1266 (historical).
- 1870. Vol. 23. p. 121.
- 1871. Vol. 24. p. 62.
- 1872. Vol. 25. p. 129.
- 1873. Vol. 26. p. 133.
- 1889. Vol. 42. p. 98.
- 1890. Vol. 43. pp. 151–152.
- 1891. Vol. 44. p. 166.
- 1892. Vol. 45. p. 129.
- 1893. Vol. 46. p. 153.
- 1894. Vol. 47. p. 213.
- 1895. Vol. 48. p. 238.
- 1896. Vol. 49. p. 248.
- 1897. Vol. 50. p. 251. Archived from the original on 27 March 2022.
- 1898. Vol. 51. p. 327.
- 1899. Vol. 52. p. 334. Archived from the original on 27 March 2022.
- 1900. Vol. 53. p. 345.
- 1901. Vol. 54. p. 340.
- DCB (1966–2005). Dictionary of Canadian Biography (English ed.). Dictionnaire Biographique du Canada (French ed.) (15 Vols.). University of Toronto and Presses de l'Université Laval.
1. Reaney, James Stewart (1926–2008) (2005). "Blackburn, Victoria Grace". Vol. 15: 1921–1930. Vol. 15. ISBN 978-0-8020-9087-4, 0-8020-9087-7; OCLC 505231761 (all editions).
  1. Via University of Toronto online. Archived from the original on 21 March 2014.
  2. Via Internet Archive (in French) (French ed.). pp. 126–128.
- Hellmuth College Prospectus (May 1878). Hellmuth Ladies' College; London, Ontario. Incorporated A.D. 1869. Founded by the Right Rev. I. Hellmuth, DD., D.C.L., Lord Bishop of Huron. Inaugurated by H.R.H. Prince Arthur, Sept. 23rd, 1869. Patron and President: The Right Rev. The Lord Bishop of Huron. Visitors: The Very Rev. The Dean of Huron. The Very Rev. The Dean of Toronto ... (1878 Hellmuth College prospectus for prospective students). OCLC 18054192 (all editions).
1. Via Internet Archive (University of Ontario).
- Johnston, Sheila M.F. (1997). Buckskin and Broadcloth: A Celebration of E. Pauline Johnson-Tekahionwake; 1861–1913. Toronto: Dundurn Press. p. 47. ISBN 978-1-5548-8112-3, 1-5548-8112-9, ISBN 1-8962-1920-9 (Natural Heritage/Natural History ed.); OCLC 606476166 (all editions).
1. Via Google Books (limited preview). Archived from the original on April 1, 2017.
- Smith-Baranzini, Marlene (Winter 1999–2000). "Out of the Shadows Louise Clappe's Life and Early California Writing". California History. 78 (4): 238–261. Archived from the original on 11 March 2016. JSTOR 25462581 (article); ISSN 0162-2897 (journal); doi:10.2307/25462581 (article); OCLC 5543617771 (article).
- Strong-Boag, Veronica Jane; Gerson, Carole (2000). Paddling Her Own Canoe: The Times and Texts of E. Pauline Johnson. University of Toronto Press. p. 53. OCLC 288098079 (all editions).
1. Via Google Books (limited preview).
