= Dufferin Medal =

Former award in Canada

- Country: Canada
- Presented by: Lord Dufferin and Lady Dufferin
- First award: 1872
- Final award: 1878
- Related: Governor General's Awards

The Dufferin Medal was a Canadian award instituted in 1873 by the Earl of Dufferin — Canada's third governor-general who served in that role from 1872 to 1878. The Dufferin Medal was an official British commendation to Canadian students and athletes who had achieved high excellence in academics and athletics. Lord Dufferin and Lady Dufferin presented the medals to honorees, annually, through the end of their appointment in 1878. Dufferin Medals were the forerunner to Governor General's Awards. While gold, silver, and bronze denoted first, second, and third, acknowledgement in biographies often only reference the "Dufferin Medal". Gold medals in proficiency categories — where competition was not involved — were rarely awarded.

== Medal prestige ==
Academic institutions and athletic clubs used their medal counts to tout opportunities for recognition and institutional excellence. Lord Dufferin and Lady Dufferin, who were popular among Canadians, gained greater popularity for the gifts. And while the awards came with no cash, the medals themselves held tangible value as precious metal. The Dufferin Medals went a long way towards motivating students, artists, musicians, and athletes, and had the same positive effect on validating efforts of institutions, professors, academicians, and coaches.

== Categories ==
Academics and fine arts
Gold, silver, and bronze medals were awarded for best essays, mathematics, foreign languages, literature, modern languages, debate, proficiency in music, art, and the like. Criteria for the academic awards were determined by individual academic institutions from all Canadian provinces and were not competitive on an intercollegiate basis. Gold medals, though, were awarded to students who had achieved national and international prominence.

Athletics
No athletic category was specified, but Lord and Lady Dufferin presented gold, silver, and bronze medals to champion curlers, skaters, yachtsmen, rowers, cricketers, marksmen, quoits tossers, and lacrosse players. Honorees hailed under the auspices of universities, athletic clubs, and national and international events. In some cases, athletes were awarded medals for collective achievements.

== Design ==
The design of the medals went through at least two iterations. In 1877, the medals were made of solid metal — gold, silver, or bronze — and recipients were given bronze duplicates. One side portrayed the British coat of arms, with the motto, Per Vias Rectas. The other side showed full heads of the Earl of Dufferin and the Countess at the left. Their profiles are encircled with the inscription, "Earl of Dufferin, K.P., K.C.B., G.C.M.G., Governor General of Canada, Countess of Dufferin". Engraved on the rim, in rustic characters, was the name of the student's institution, the year, and the student's name.

Of the 18 gold medals awarded, four are known to still exist.

== Notable recipients ==
- 1873: Edwin Arnold Vail, Gold Medal for Marksmanship, winning the most points at the Wimbledon Cup
- 1873: Kate Sara Chittenden, Bronze Medal for Art, Hellmuth Ladies' College
- 1874: John Stewart McLennan, Gold Medal for Historical Research and Cultivation of English Style, McGill University
- 1875: Charles Langelier, Silver Medal for Second Best Academic Work at Laval University
- 1876: Charles Fitzpatrick, Silver Medal for Second Best Academic Work at Laval University
- 1877: James McKay, Bronze Medal for Ancient and Modern History, St. John's College at the University of Manitoba
- 1877: Thomas Chase-Casgrain, Silver Medal for Second Best Academic Work at Laval University
- 1878: Ned Hanlan, Gold Medal, Champion Sculler

== See also ==
- Governor General's Academic Medal
