= Emilie Poulsson =

American writer (1853–1939)

- Born: September 8, 1853; Cedar Grove, New Jersey, U.S.
- Died: March 18, 1939 (aged 85)
- Education: Perkins School for the Blind
- Occupation: Author
- Parent(s): Halvor Poulsson; Ruth Anne Mitchell
- Writing career
- Genre: Children's literature

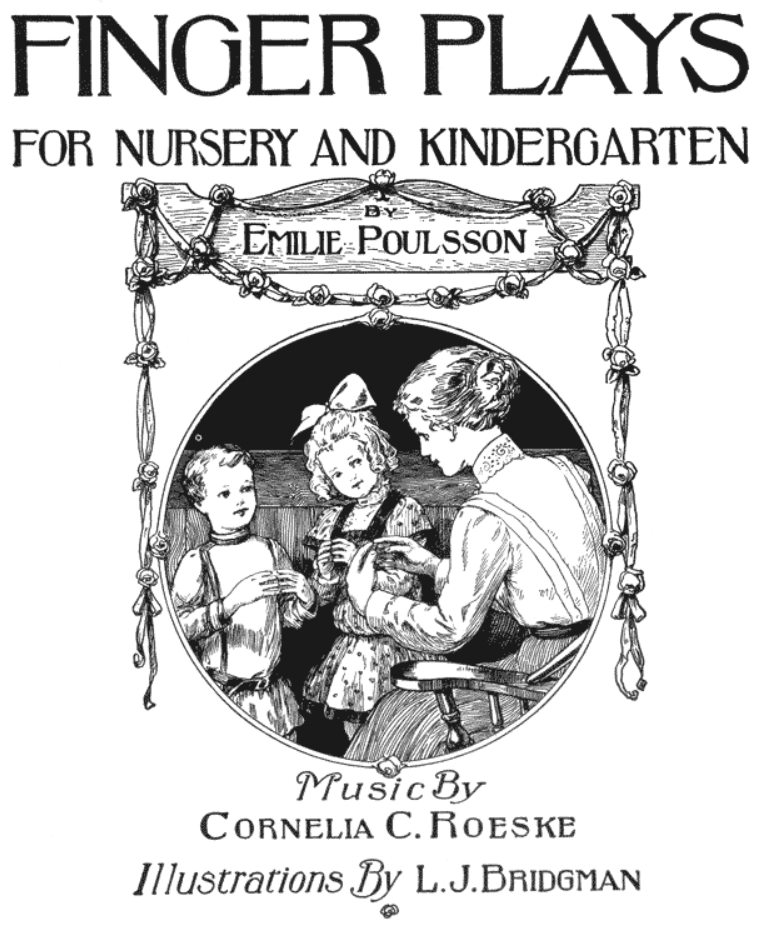
Title page of Finger Plays for Nursery and Kindergarten by Emilie Poulsson, published in 1893.

Anne Emilie Poulsson (September 8, 1853 – March 18, 1939) was an American children's author and campaigner for early childhood education and the kindergarten movement.

Poulsson was born in Cedar Grove, New Jersey. She was the daughter of Halvor Poulsson and Ruth Anne Poulsson (née Mitchell). Her father, an immigrant from Norway, died when she was still young. From the age of six months, she developed a serious eye condition resulting in visual impairment, which would eventually render her blind. She was taught to read at home and started at a public school at the age of eight, going on to high school at twelve. She learned braille at the Perkins School for the Blind in Watertown, Massachusetts. For several years in her 20s, she lived with the family of composer and music educator Mabel Madison Watson. She later taught and lectured in Boston, Massachusetts. Poulsson was an advocate of the educationalist Friedrich Fröbel. She wrote and gave lectures on parenting, as well as writing books for children. She made a number of trips to Norway and together with her sister Laura E. Poulsson, translated the works of others authors from the Norwegian language.

One of her poems from Rhyme Time for Children is sometimes quoted in support of literacy campaigns:

Books are keys to wisdom's treasure;
books are gates to lands of pleasure.
Books are paths that upward lead.
Books are friends; come, let us read.

== Bibliography ==
- Kindergarten and Primary School for the Blind co-written with Michael Anagnostopoulos (1884)
- Finger plays for nursery and kindergarten (1893)
- In the child's world (1893)
- Through the farmyard gate (1896)
- Love and Law in Child Training: A Book for Mothers (1899)
- The Runaway Donkey and Other Rhymes (1905)
- Top-of-the-World Stories for Boys and Girls (Translated from Scandinavian languages with Laura E. Poulsson, 1916)
- Rhyme Time For Children
- Baby's Breakfast
- Mrs. Cat's Dinner
- The Christmas Cake: A Story from Norway
- Holiday Songs And Every Day Songs And Games (1901)
- What Happened to Inger Johanne by Dikken Zwilgmeyer (Translation, 1919)
