= Madge Macbeth =

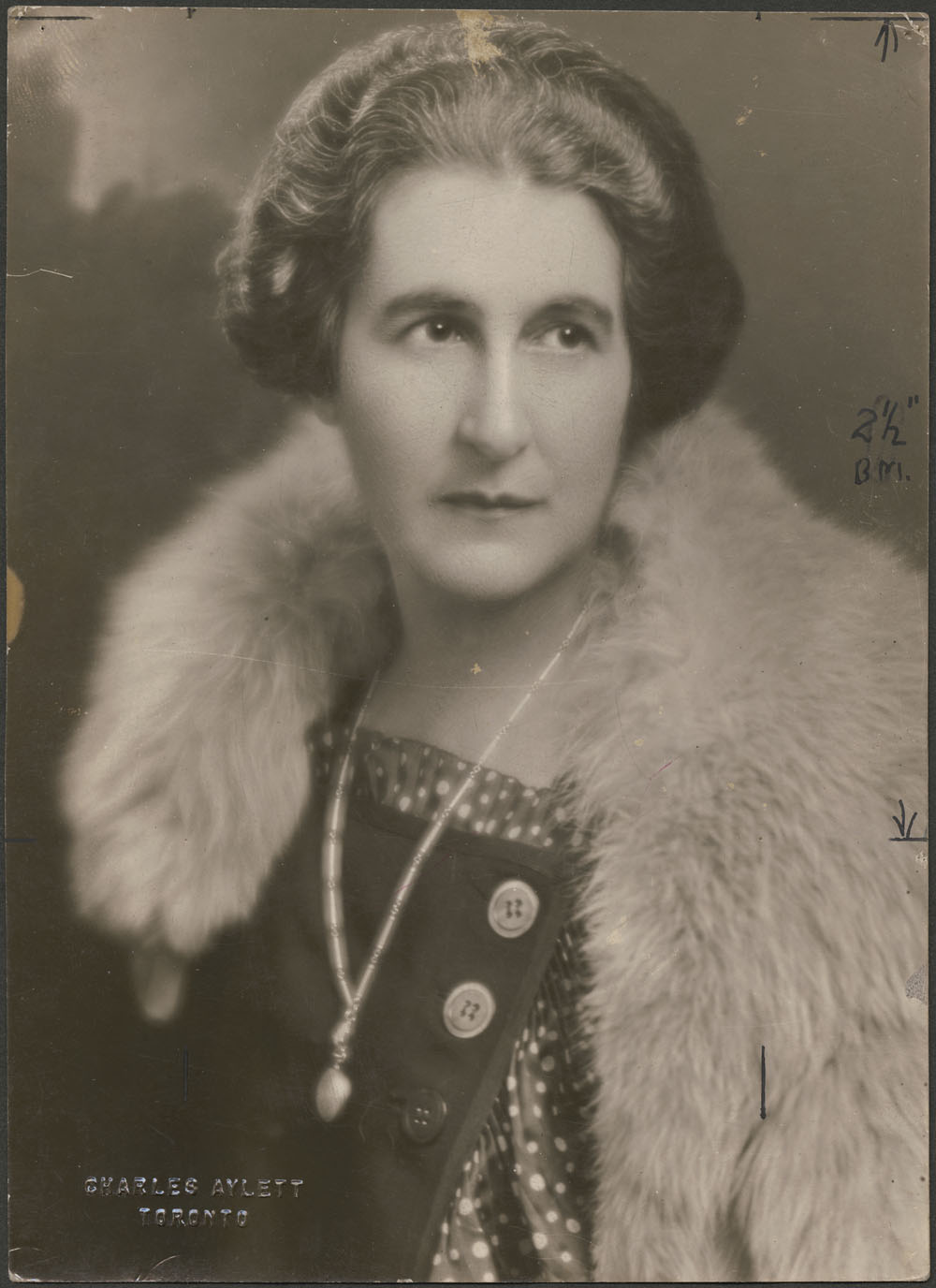
- Madge Macbeth, 1920s
- Born: Philadelphia
- Died: Ottawa, Ontario

Madge Hamilton Lyons Macbeth (November 6, 1878 (Note: Some sources say 1880) – September 20, 1965) was an American-born Canadian writer.

== Life and career ==
The daughter of Bessie Maffit and Hymen Hart Lyons, she was born Madge Hamilton Lyons in Philadelphia. She attended Hellmuth Ladies' College in London, Ontario and worked on the school paper there. After graduation, she performed as a touring mandolinist in Maryland from 1899 to 1901.

In 1901, she married Charles William Macbeth, a Canadian civil engineer. The couple lived in Detroit and then moved to Ottawa around 1904. Her husband died of tuberculosis in 1908, leaving her with two young sons.

She began writing to support her family and published her first two stories in Canada West and the Canadian Magazine. She published The Winning Game, her first novel, in 1910. Macbeth was a founding member of the Ottawa Little Theatre. She published a column "Over My Shoulder" in the Ottawa Citizen, where she also worked as a photographer. She also wrote advertisements, including brochures for the Canadian Pacific Railway, short stories for magazines, interviews with members of the Canadian parliament and articles on local history.

She was elected president of the Canadian Authors Association in 1939, 1940 and 1941, becoming the first women head of that organization.

Macbeth died in Ottawa at the age of 86.

== Selected works ==
- Kleath, novel (1917)
- The Patterson Limit, novel (1923)
- The Land of Afternoon, political satire (1924), using pen name Gilbert Knox
- Shackles, novel (1926)
- The Kinder Bees, political satire (1935), writing as Gilbert Knox
- Over My Shoulder, memoir (1953)
- Boulevard Career, memoir (1957)
