= Marian Osborne =

Canadian writer

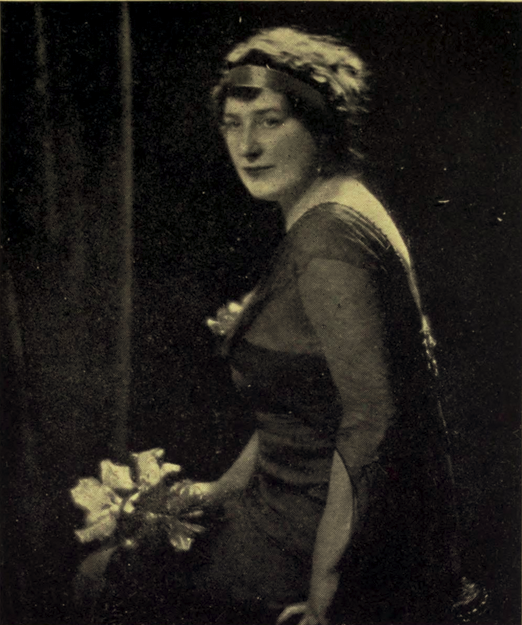
- Born: May 14, 1871; Montreal, Canada
- Died: September 5, 1931 (aged 60); Ottawa, Canada
- Education: Hellmuth Ladies' College
- Occupation: Writer

Marian Francis Osborne (May 14, 1871 – September 5, 1931) was a Canadian writer.

The daughter of George Grant Francis, from Wales, and Marian Osler, who was the cousin of Sir William Osler, she was born Marian Georgina Francis in Montreal. She attended the Sacred Heart Convent in London, Ontario and then Hellmuth Ladies' College. She attended Trinity College but never graduated, leaving school to marry Charles Lambert Bath in 1893. The couple lived in Swansea in Wales. Osborne returned to Canada after her husband committed suicide in 1899. In 1902, she married Colonel Henry Campbell Osborne, a lawyer and member of the military.

In 1914, she published Poems. While she was living in Ottawa during the 1920s, she published poems for children, sonnets and a play The Point of View, a comedy and two ballets. A British film company purchased her scenario The Priest and the Pagan. English composer Frank Lambert set several of her lyrics to music.

Osborne died in Ottawa of liver disease at the age of 60 and was buried in Beechwood Cemetery.
