= Phi Kappa Sigma =

North American collegiate secret society and fraternity

- ΦΚΣ
- Founded: October 19, 1850; 175 years ago University of Pennsylvania
- Type: Social
- Affiliation: NIC
- Status: Active
- Scope: North America
- Mottos: Stellis Aequus Durando “Equal to the Stars in Endurance”
- Slogan: Once a Phi Kap, Always a Phi Kap; Brotherhood is More Than Skin Deep; Men of Honor Since 1850
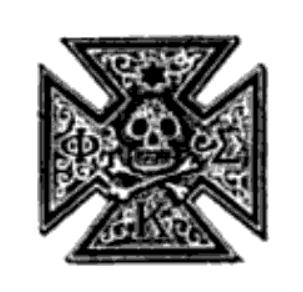
- Member badge
- Colors: Black; Old Gold
- Symbol: Maltese Cross
- Flag
- Flower: Yellow Chrysanthemum
- Publication: Maltese Cross
- Philanthropy: Blood Cancer United
- Chapters: 32
- Colonies: 3
- Members: 1,500 active 35,000+ lifetime
- Nickname: Skulls
- Headquarters: 716 Adams St; Carmel, Indiana 46032; United States
- Website: pks.org

Phi Kappa Sigma (ΦΚΣ), also known as Phi Kap, Skulls, Skullhouse, or PKS, is an international all-male college secret society and social fraternity. Commonly known as “Skulls”, the name is inspired by the skull and crossbones on the fraternity's badge and coat of arms. Members are often recognized by the solid gold membership pin depicting the fraternity’s symbol, a Maltese Cross surrounding a human skull.

== History ==
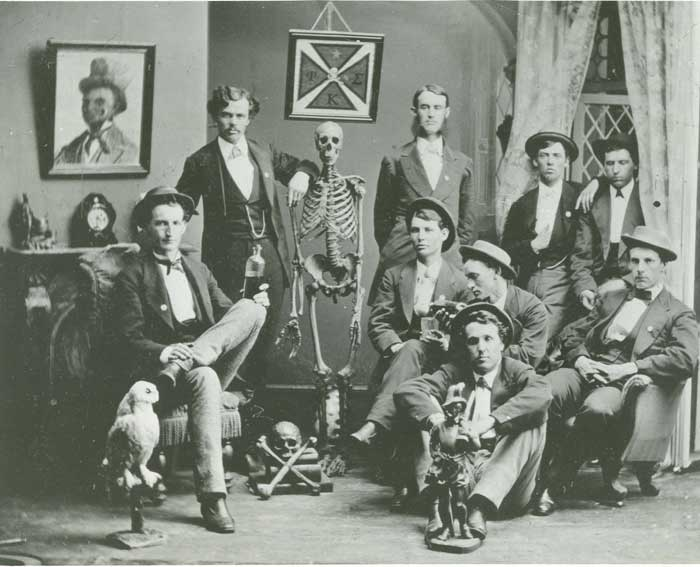
Members of Phi Kappa Sigma at Washington & Jefferson College in Washington, Pennsylvania, 1872

Samuel Brown Wylie Mitchell founded Phi Kappa Sigma at the University of Pennsylvania. Mitchell recorded the initial concepts of Phi Kappa Sigma on August 16, 1850. He discussed his idea with other students, including Alfred Victor du Pont, James Bayard Hodge, Charles Hare Hutchinson, Andrew Adams Ripka, John Thorne Stone, and Duane Williams. The seven men formally founded the fraternity on October 19, 1850, becoming the founding fathers of Phi Kappa Sigma.

The fraternity became regional with the establishment of the Beta chapter at Princeton University and Gamma chapter at Lafayette College in 1853. Other chapters soon followed elsewhere in Pennsylvania, including the Zeta Chapter at Franklin & Marshall College, which currently serves as the oldest active chapter of the fraternity worldwide. Members from the South at the University of Pennsylvania, led the establishment of eight chapters in southern states between 1855 and 1860. The Civil War resulted in the closing of the Southern chapters; although three of the eight chapters were later revived.

The fraternity began publishing the Phi Kappa Sigma Quarterly in February 1891. It was succeeded by Phi Kappa Sigma News Letter in 1901. The fraternity published its first songbook in 1906, followed by a second edition in 1912.

Phi Kappa Sigma was a charter member of the North American Interfraternity Conference. Since 2017, it has been headquartered in Carmel, Indiana. Previously, its offices were in Philadelphia, Valley Forge, and Chester Springs.

As of 2024, the fraternity has 1,500 undergraduates and over 35,000 alumni. It has 42 active chapters and three colonies.

== Symbols ==
Phi Kappa Sigma's colors are black and old gold. Its symbol is the Maltese cross, surrounding a skull and crossbones. Maltese Cross is also the name of its publication. The fraternity's flower is the yellow chrysanthemum. Its motto is Stellis Aequus Durando or "Equal to the stars in endurance."

The fraternity's badge was designed by its founder, Samuel Brown Wylie Mitchell. Other than changes in size, its design has remained the same. It is a gold Maltese cross with black decoration. The center of the cross has a skull and crossbones. The four arms of the cross display, individually, the Greek letters Φ, Κ, and Σ, starting at the left arm and rotating counter-clockwise. The fourth and top arm display a six-pointed star. The back of the badge has an engraved serpent echoing the serpent from the fraternity's coat of arms.

Its coat of arms is a shield that includes the fraternity's symbols on its four quarters, a crest of the skull and bones, and the motto "Stellis Aequus Durando". The fraternity's flag is black with the letters ΦΚΣ in the center and a skull and crossbones in the upper left corner, both in gold.

Its members are known as “Skulls”, the name is inspired by the skull and crossbones on the fraternity's badge and coat of arms.

== Chapters ==
As of 2026, Phi Kappa Sigma has 34 active chapters and three colonies.

== Notable members ==
Phi Kappa Sigma is an Antebellum fraternity, one of the country's earliest collegiate societies and the 19th of the 36 national Greek letter organizations formed before the Civil War. Since that founding generations of members have achieved notability in politics, law, business, professional sports, or military service. Every year from 1886 through 1980, at least one Skull was serving in the United States Senate. This 94-year history of Skull’s involvement in the Senate ended when Richard Schweiker (Psi, 1954) retired from the Senate to serve as United States Secretary of Health and Human Services under the administration of President Ronald Reagan.

== See also ==
- List of social fraternities and sororities
- Collegiate secret societies in North America
