= Charles "Sis Doc" Richardson =

American sorority founder

Charles Richardson
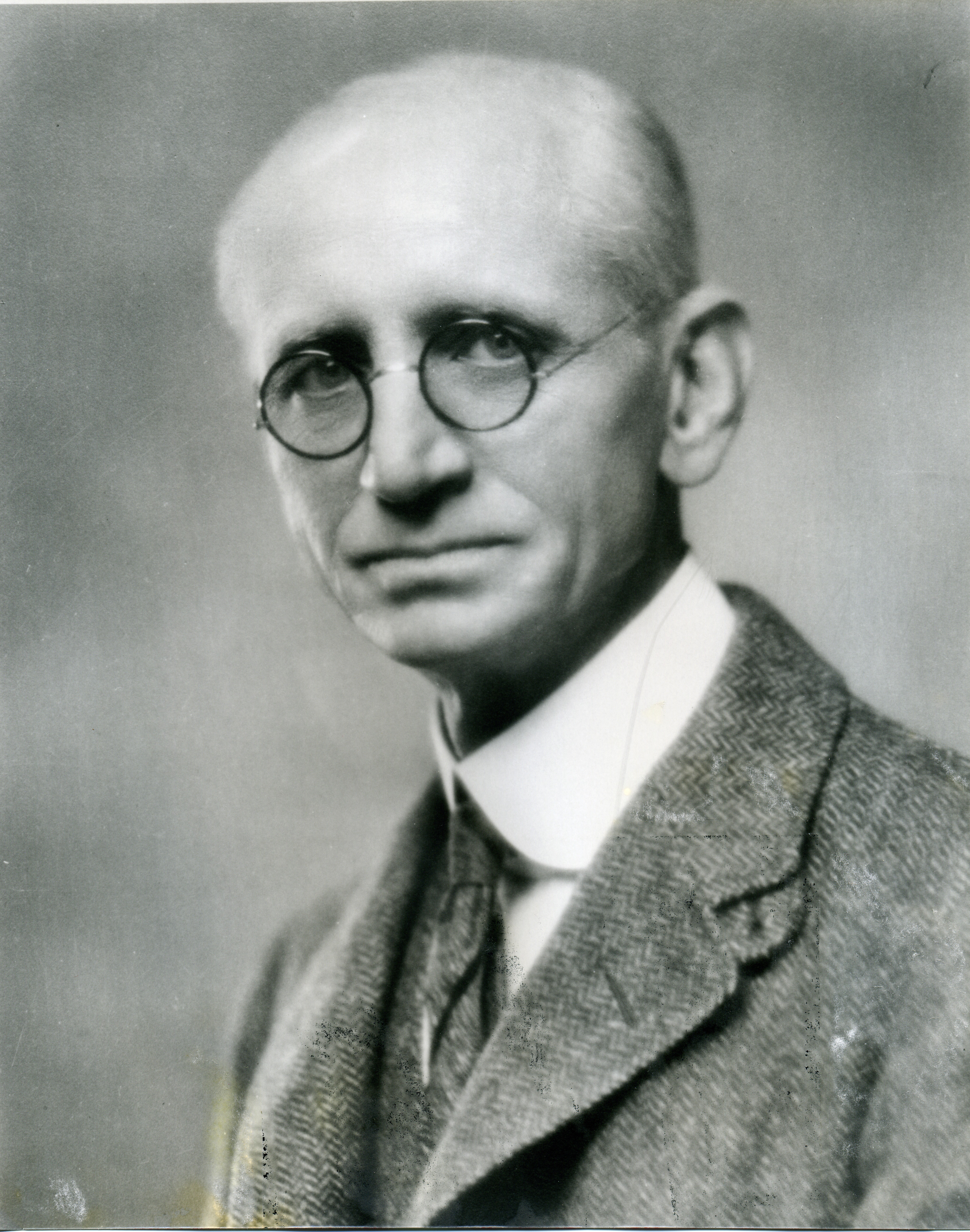
- Richardson circa 1920
- Born: January 8, 1864 near Rich Valley, Virginia
- Died: December 22, 1924 (aged 60); Fayetteville, Arkansas
- Burial place: Fairview Memorial Gardens, Fayetteville, Arkansas
- Other name: Sis Doc
- Education: Emory & Henry College, Vanderbilt University
- Occupations: Dentist, newspaper editor

Charles Richardson (January 8, 1864 – December 22, 1924) was a dentist, newspaper publisher and editor, and college fraternity leader. He was best known as a Kappa Sigma fraternity leader and a founder of Chi Omega fraternity for women, which is now the largest women's sorority in the United States.

== Early life ==
Charles Richardson was born near Rich Valley, Virginia in 1864. He had ten siblings. Richardson attended Emory and Henry College where he became a member of the Omikron chapter of the Kappa Sigma fraternity on January 5, 1883.

Following graduation from Emory and Henry College, he taught school in Marion, Virginia. He moved to Nashville, Tennessee where he attended Vanderbilt University Dental School (now defunct), graduating in 1888.

== Career ==
After dental school, Richardson moved to Arkansas, first to Greenwood and then to Fayetteville, where he practiced dentistry. By the early 1920s, Richardson retired from dentistry and purchased a newspaper. He became the editor-in-chief and managing editor of the Fayetteville Daily Democrat and part owner of the Democrat Publishing and Printing Company. He also occasionally wrote travelogues for the newspaper.

== Fraternities ==
=== Kappa Sigma Fraternity ===
After moving to Fayetteville, Arkansas, Richardson noticed that there were no Greek letter organizations at the local Arkansas Industrial University, now the University of Arkansas. He began lobbying with the university's board of trustees to permit a Kappa Sigma chapter. On May 29, 1890, Richardson assisted John C. Futrall, William A Crawford, Carl C. Miller, William Shields Goodwin, and George B. Pugh in founding the Xi chapter of Kappa Sigma.

Richardson served as Worthy Grand Procurator (National Vice President) of Kappa Sigma from 1898 to 1906. During that time, he installed chapters at William Jewell College, the University of Missouri, the Missouri School of Mines (now Missouri University of Science and Technology), Washington University in St. Louis, Baker University, and the University of Oklahoma. Richardson was the longest-serving Worthy Grand Procurator in the fraternity's history.

In 1921, Richardson was one of three trustees who oversaw the purchase of the fraternity's first chapter house at the University of Arkansas.

=== Chi Omega Fraternity ===
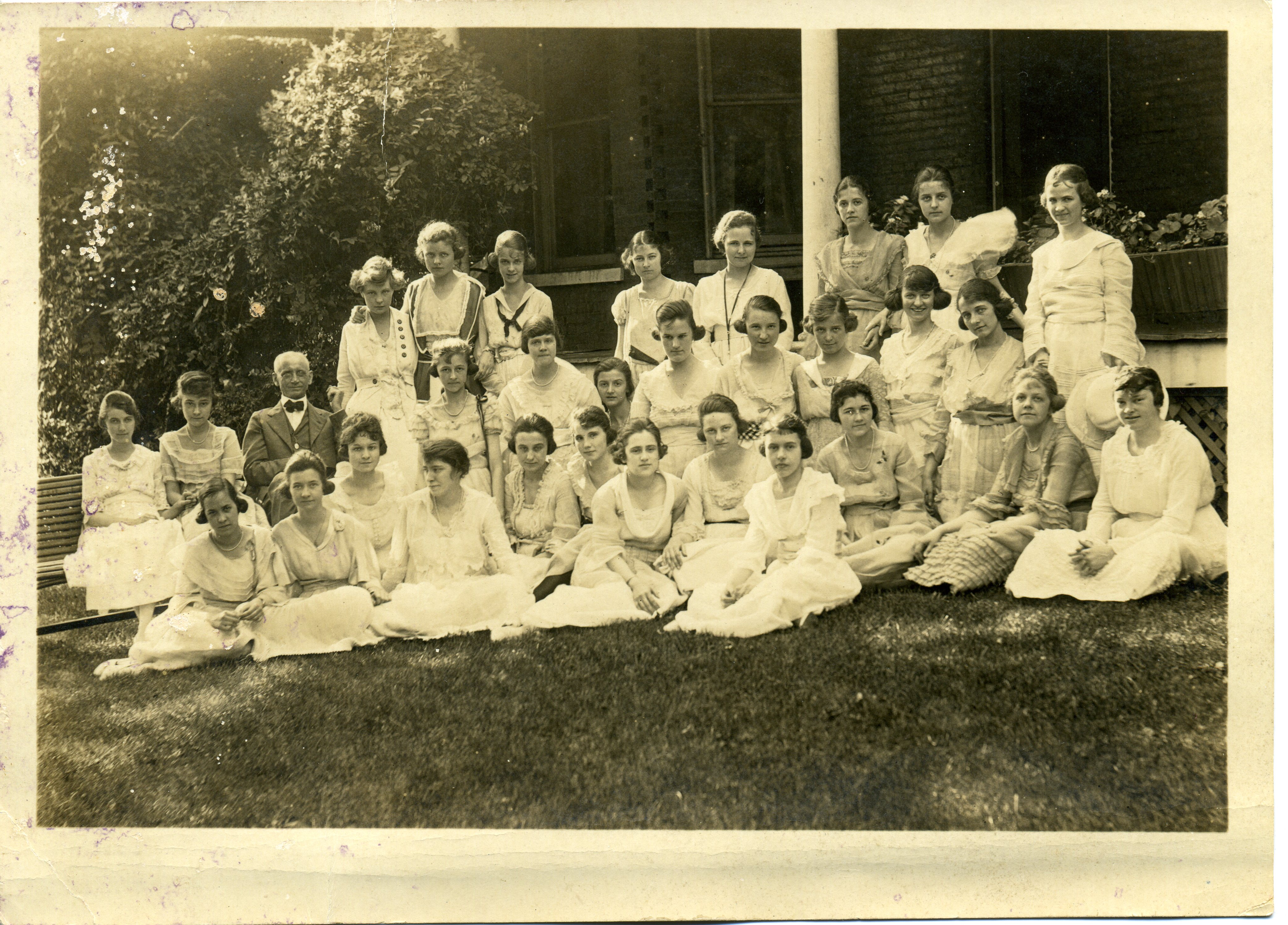
Richardson with Chi Omegas, c. 1919

In 1895, four female Arkansas Industrial University students asked Richardson for his assistance in starting a fraternity for women. With Richard's assistance, Psi chapter of Chi Omega was founded April 4, 1895, by Ina Mae Boles, Jean Vincenheller, Jobelle Holcombe, and Alice Cary Simonds.

Richardson drafted the ritual, constitution, and by-laws of Chi Omega. He also fabricated the Chi Omega badge from dental gold. For his help, the women's fraternity made Richardson its only honorary member. He was affectionately known as "Sis Doc" by Chi Omega members.

Richardson regularly met with members of Chi Omega and attended many of their national conventions. He was also a regular contributor to the fraternity's national magazine, The Eleusis.

=== Other fraternities ===
Richardson was also instrumental in the formation of the second and third men's fraternities at the University of Arkansas, the Alpha Upsilon chapter of Sigma Alpha Epsilon in 1894 and the Alpha Omicron chapter of Kappa Alpha Order in 1895.

== Personal life ==
Richardson was a member of the Masonic order, along with the Rotary Club, and the Elks. He was also a bank director and an officer in the Chamber of Commerce. He was also the first person in Fayetteville to purchase an automobile, often taking the Chi Omega sisters for rides in his 1908 Ford Model N Runabout. He never married and did not have any children.

When he died at his home in Fayetteville, Arkansas in 1924, Richardson's body lay in state at the Chi Omega house where it was overseen by members of Kappa Sigma. The room was lit by the Chi Omega owl and the Kappa Sigma star and crescent. Richardson was interred in the Fairview Memorial Gardens in Fayetteville.

Chi Omega chapters outside of Arkansas also held memorial services for Richardson. In April 1925, Mary C. Love Collins, academic and national president of Chi Omega, dedicated her book, Human Conduct and the Law, to Richardson, noting, he "endowed Chi Omega with the idea of service." During its 16th National Convention in Hot Springs, Arkansas, Chi Omega held memorial services at Richardson's grave on June 29, 1930.

== Legacy ==
- During the 150th anniversary Grand Conclave of Kappa Sigma in 2019, Richardson was posthumously inducted in the fraternity's Hall of Honor.
- Richardson's pearl horseshoe stickpin is on display at the Chi Omega headquarters in Memphis, Tennessee.
- All four fraternal chapters that Richardson helped create at the University of Arkansas are still active.
- Chi Omega has installed 181 collegiate chapters and 248 alumnae chapters with more than 402,000 initiated members.
