= George Henry Martin Johnson =

Mohawk chief

George Henry Martin Johnson Onwanonsyshon
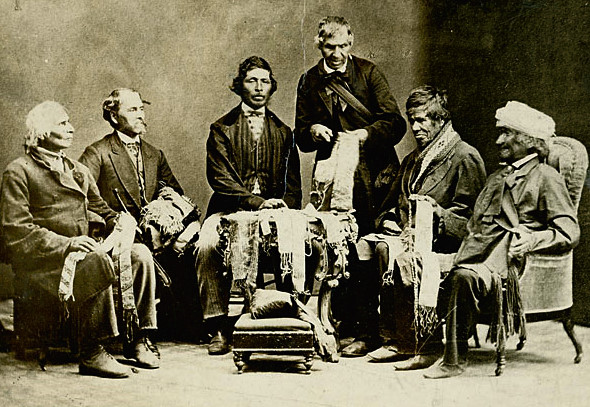
- Chief George Johnson, seated centre, with anthropologist Horatio Hale on the left, and fellow chiefs of the Mohawk nation
- Born: Deyonhehgon; October 7, 1816; Bow Park, Grand River, North America
- Died: February 19, 1884 (aged 67); Grand River, Canada
- Other name: Onwanonsyshon
- Citizenship: Mohawk
- Education: Mohawk Institute
- Occupation: Interpreter
- Known for: Six Nations chief
- Office: Royaner
- Spouse: Emily Susanna Howells (m. 1853–1884)
- Children: Pauline Johnson, 3 others

George Henry Martin Johnson or Onwanonsyshon (October 7, 1816 – February 19, 1884) was a member of the Wolf clan and condoled Royaner of the Mohawk of the Six Nations in Canada; he also served as an official interpreter and informal diplomat between the Mohawk and Canadian governments. His home of Chiefswood, built in 1856 on the Grand River, has been designated and preserved as a National Historic Site; it is the only First Nations mansion from the pre-Canadian Confederation era.

== Early life ==
Johnson was born at Bow Park on the Grand River on the Six Nations of the Grand River First Nation near Brantford in 1816. The Wolf clan members had founded the Reserve after resettling from New York during the American Revolution.

He was the son of John Smoke Johnson, a Mohawk Bear clan chief, and Helen Martin, a Mohawk whose Dutch mother Catherine Rolleston had been captured as a girl and adopted and assimilated into the Wolf clan. Her father Ohyeatea (George Martin) was Mohawk. The couple lived with her parents until after their first child was born, in Mohawk custom.

== Education ==
George Johnson was educated at the Mohawk Institute, where he became fluent in English as well as Mohawk.

== Career ==
In 1838, Johnson was hired by the Reverend Adam Elliot as an interpreter. In 1840, he became interpreter for the Anglican mission at the Reserve. He became influential in both the English and Mohawk communities.

== Marriage and family ==
In 1853, Johnson married Emily Susanna Howells, a native of England whose family had immigrated to the United States in 1832. She was the sister-in-law of Reverend Elliot and a cousin of the American author William Dean Howells. Both families, and the Native community in general, opposed Johnson's interracial marriage to a white woman. The Mohawk resented that under Canadian law, Howells as Johnson's wife would gain status as a Native, with a right "to a portion of her band’s annuities and other benefits." Under the Mohawk matrilineal kinship system, her children would have not fully belonged to the tribe as they would not be part of any clan. Reverend Elliot refused to perform the marriage ceremony, so the couple found another Anglican priest who would.

The couple educated their four children to embrace both their Mohawk and English heritage. The Johnsons entertained leading figures of the time at their home of Chiefswood, which George had built in 1856 on his 225-acre estate. Their youngest daughter Pauline Johnson (1861-1913) became nationally known as a Canadian poet and performer known for representing her First Nations heritage. Her fame surpassed that of her father. His daughter Evelyn also became a poet.

== Later life ==
Johnson was elected as a hereditary Royaner of the Six Nations, succeeding his mother's brother, Henry Martin of the Wolf clan. The Mohawk had a matrilineal kinship system, in which descent and property passed through the woman's line, and his mother nominated him for the post.

He later became friends with Jasper Tough Gilkison, Upper Canada Superintendent to the Six Nations. He was appointed government interpreter. Johnson served as a timber ranger, making efforts to control the theft of timber and sale of whiskey on the reserve by unscrupulous non-native men. He was badly beaten in 1865 for this, and attacked again in 1873, when he was shot. The sale of timber and whiskey was lucrative for whites.

In 1884 Johnson died at his estate Chiefswood on the Grand River near Brantford. It has been listed as a National Historic Site and is the only Native mansion surviving from the pre-Confederation years. The house and summer kitchen wing were restored in the early 21st century. In addition, much of the open grounds have been restored since the late 20th century to the Ontario Tall Grass Prairie Meadows that were characteristic at the time of the family's residence and had plants used by the Mohawk for medicinal purposes. Today less than five acres remain associated with the mansion. Other parts of the more than 200-acre estate were sold by heirs over the years.

== See also ==
- Alexander Graham Bell honors and tributes
