= Chi Omega =

American collegiate women's fraternity

- ΧΩ
- Founded: April 5, 1895; 131 years ago University of Arkansas
- Type: Social
- Affiliation: NPC
- Status: Active
- Scope: National
- Motto: "Sisters on purpose"
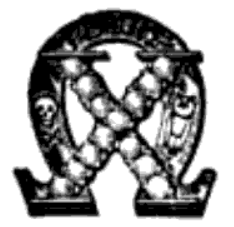
- Member badge
- Colors: Cardinal and Straw
- Symbol: Skull and Crossbones
- Flower: White Carnation
- Jewel: Pearl and Diamond
- Mascot: Owl
- Patron Greek deity: Demeter
- Publication: The Eleusis
- Philanthropy: Make-A-Wish Foundation
- Chapters: 181
- Members: 400,000+ lifetime
- Headquarters: 3395 Players Club Parkway; Memphis, Tennessee 38125; United States
- Website: www.chiomega.com

Chi Omega (ΧΩ, also known as ChiO) is an American women's collegiate fraternity. It was established in 1895 at the University of Arkansas. Chi Omega has 181 active collegiate chapters and approximately 240 alumnae chapters. Since its founding in 1895 at the University of Arkansas, the sorority has initiated over 355,000 members with more than 28,000 undergraduates added each year, making it the largest women's sorority organization by membership. It is a member of the National Panhellenic Conference.

== History ==
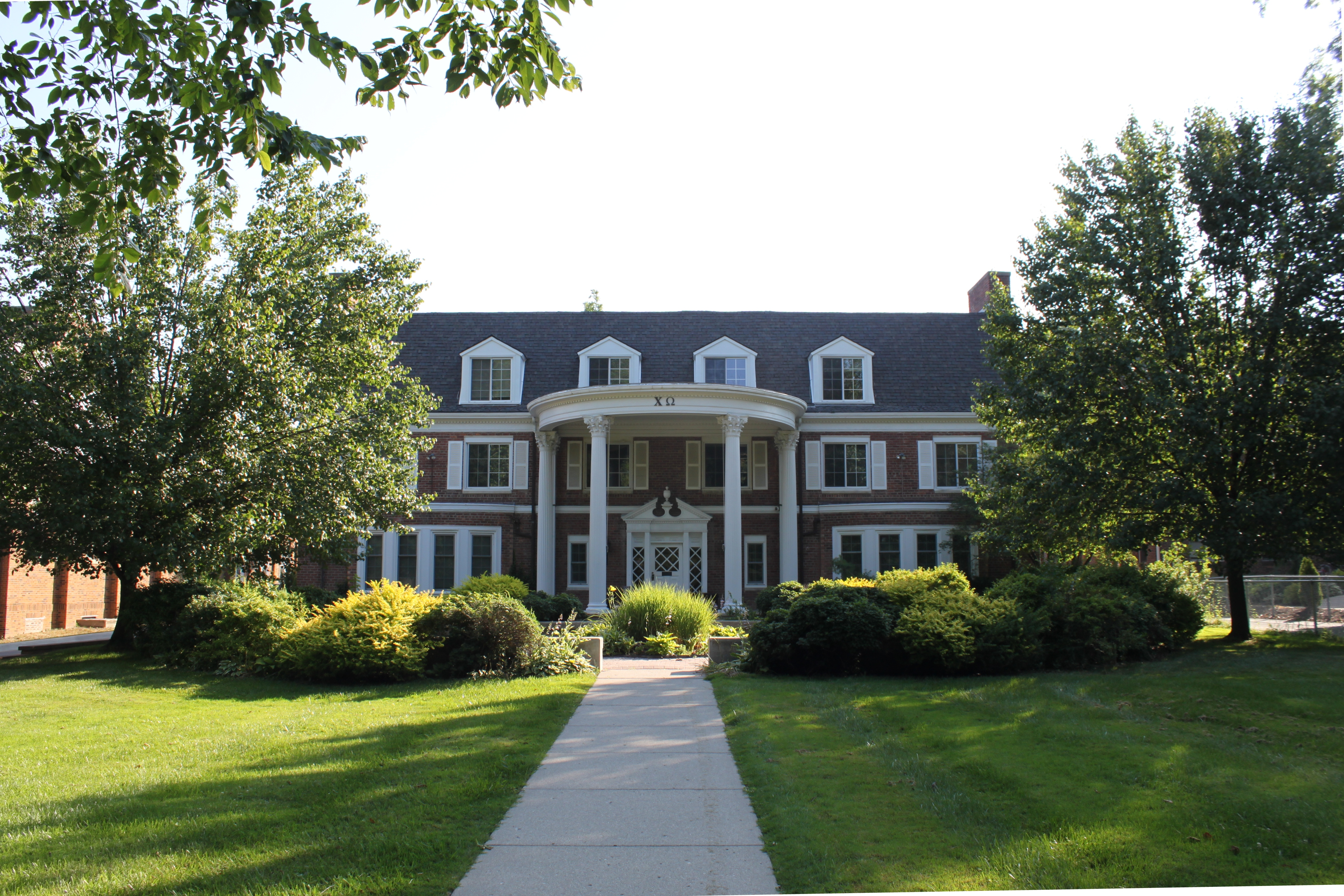
Chi Omega chapter house at the University of Michigan

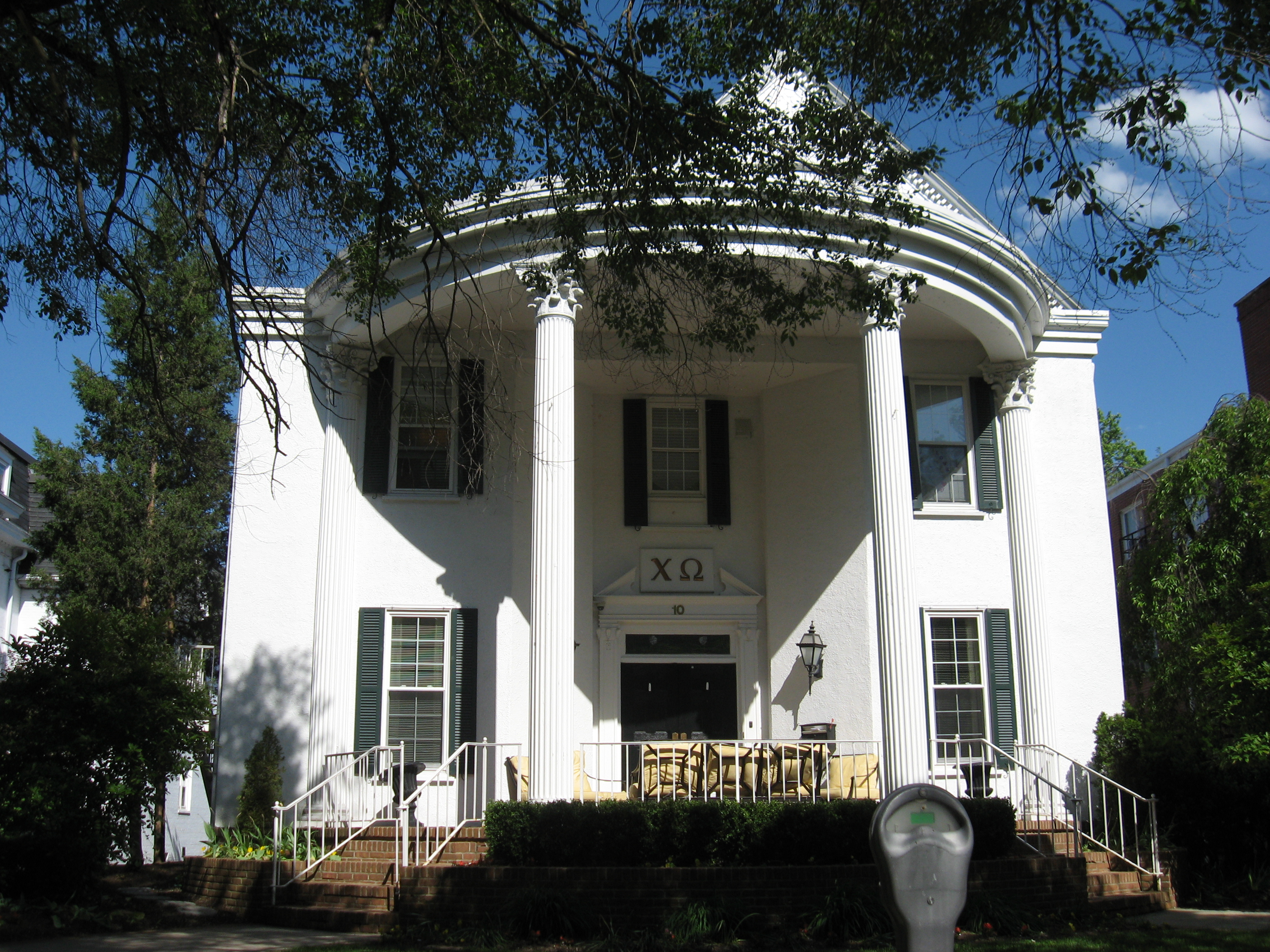
Chi Omega chapter house at Ohio University

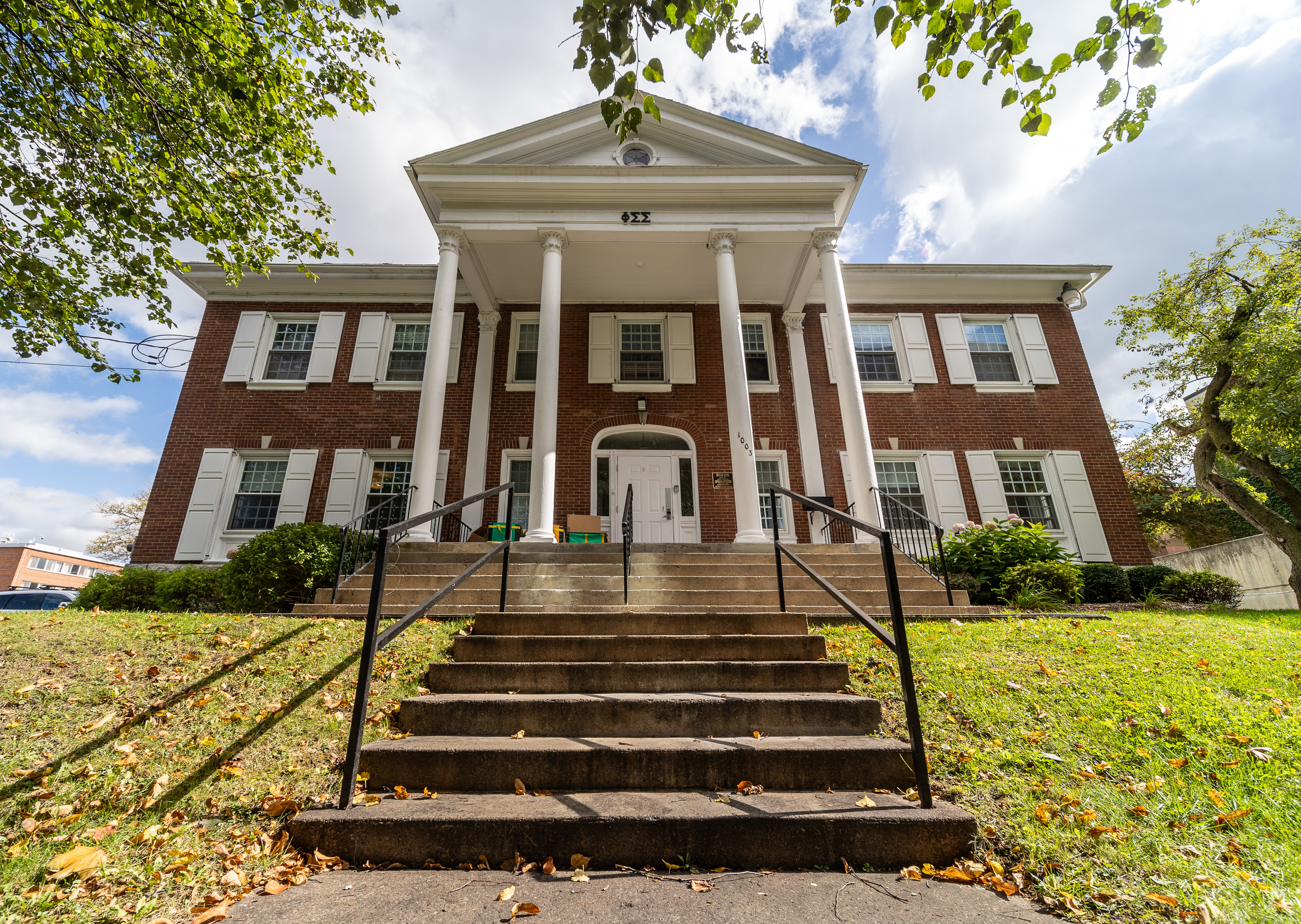
Chi Omega chapter house at Syracuse University

Chi Omega was founded April 5, 1895, at the University of Arkansas by Ina May Boles, Jean Vincenheller, Jobelle Holcombe, and Alice Simonds, with the help of Dr. Charles Richardson, an initiate of Kappa Sigma fraternity. This founding chapter is called the Psi chapter. Chi Omega states its founding purposes as: "friendship, personal integrity, service to others, academic excellence and intellectual pursuits, community and campus involvement and personal and career development".

It first expanded in the fall of 1898 with Chi chapter at Transylvania University; located in Lexington, Kentucky, and Hellmuth Ladies' College, located in London, Ontario. Both chapters were transferred to other schools in 1903. Chi Omega joined the National Panhellenic Conference in 1903. By its tenth anniversary, in 1905, Chi Omega had installed seventeen chapters throughout the United States.

Despite being a women's organization, Chi Omega only refers to itself as a women's fraternity instead of a sorority. As such, Chi Omega is the largest women's fraternity or sorority in the world with over 355,000 initiates and 181 collegiate chapters. The 300,000th member was initiated in 2013.

== Symbols ==
Chi Omega's crest was adopted in 1902. Centered on the crest is a white carnation, with the Greek letter Χ to the left and the Greek letter Ω to the right of the flower. Above these symbols are both the symbols of the skull and crossbones and the owl. Beneath the carnation are the Greek letters: Ρ, Β, Υ, Η, and Σ. The symbol is surrounded by a laurel wreath.

The badge of Chi Omega was regulated and adopted in 1906. Dr. Charles Richardson designed the first badge and made it completely out of scraps of hammered dental gold. The badge is a monogram of the Greek letter Χ superimposed over Ω, with fourteen pearls or diamonds on the former. The badge is to be worn only when wearing professional clothing, above all other pins and over the heart. The sorority's new member pin is an oval with the Greek letters ΧΩ on black enamel.

Chi Omega's symbols are the skull and crossbones. Its colors are cardinal and straw. Its flower is the white carnation. Chi Omega has two official jewels, the pearl and the diamond. The owl serves as the sorority's official mascot. Since 1899, The Eleusis is the official newsletter magazine of Chi Omega, named after the Greek myth. Its patron goddess is Demeter/ A secret sorority magazine Mystagogue existed from 1905 through at least 1913.

The ethos of the fraternity is embodied in a document known as the Chi Omega Symphony, composed in 1904 by Ethel Switzer Howard of the Xi Chapter at Northwestern University.

== Activities ==
In the late 1990s, the leadership in Chi Omega researched opportunities for a partnership with a national philanthropy, choosing the Make-A-Wish Foundation as their official philanthropy since 2002. Since the start of this alliance, Chi Omega has raised more than $20 million and has volunteered over one million hours for Make-A-Wish and contributed more than a million dollars annually.

Chi Omega's Nancy Walton Laurie Leadership Institute is a training program for collegiate and alumnae members. The sessions include a variety of topics based on personal development, and the program is available at various meetings and events. The Chi Omega Foundation supports the Laurie Leadership Institute.

== Governance ==
The fraternity's day-to-day business activities are overseen by its governing council, which consists of five elected alumnae, volunteer members, who are elected every two years. The current national president of Chi Omega is Anna Buckner. Chi Omega's national headquarters are located in Memphis, Tennessee.

== Local chapter or member misconduct ==
In 1971, the Delta Pennsylvania chapter at Dickinson College in Carlisle, Pennsylvania attempted to recruit an African-American woman as a member, and the national organization refused permission. Delta Nu separated from the national organization over this issue and became an independent sorority.

In 2013, the chapter at Pennsylvania State University was shut down after the sorority threw an offensive party insulting Mexican-American culture. National leadership of the sorority released a statement saying the party was not congruent with Chi Omega's values and purpose.

In 2013 and 2014, sorority women from multiple chapters at the University of Alabama in Tuscaloosa, including Chi Omega, Delta Delta Delta, Pi Beta Phi, Kappa Delta, Alpha Gamma Delta, Alpha Omicron Pi, and Phi Mu, alleged that either active members or some of their alumni had prevented them from offering membership to black candidates because of their race. An anonymous Chi Omega member told the school newspaper, The Crimson White, that their university-employed rush adviser dropped a black girl who received perfect scores after the first round of recruitment. Afterwards, chapter members requested that the Chi Omega national headquarters investigate the incident for racial discrimination, and one member of the chapter's executive board moved out of the chapter house and resigned her membership. Students held a campus march to integrate Greek life on campus, and following media and national outcry, the university held a second round of recruitment in hopes of offering membership to more women, including black women.

In 2014, the chapter at the University of Central Florida in Orlando, Florida was suspended after allegations surfaced of sorority members blindfolding two pledges under the legal drinking age and taking them to the woods to drink an entire bottle of rum. According to the police report, one pledge ended up so intoxicated that she injured herself in a fall. Members of the sorority directly involved with the hazing incident later resigned from the sorority.

In 2014, a member at the University of Alabama in Tuscaloosa, Alabama was kicked out of the sorority after releasing a racially offensive picture that included a racial slur on social media, celebrating that the chapter had not offered membership to any black women that year. The university's president and sorority's leadership both released statements condemning the photo and acknowledging the importance of embracing diversity.

In 2016, a sorority member at the University of Nebraska at Omaha was kicked out of the sorority for posting pictures wearing her sorority letters in her Tinder profile. The incident made it to a Good Morning America segment where she states she was unfairly treated and targeted by members of the sorority.

== See also ==
- List of social sororities and women's fraternities
