= John Smoke Johnson =

Mohawk leader in Canada

- Sakayengwaraton
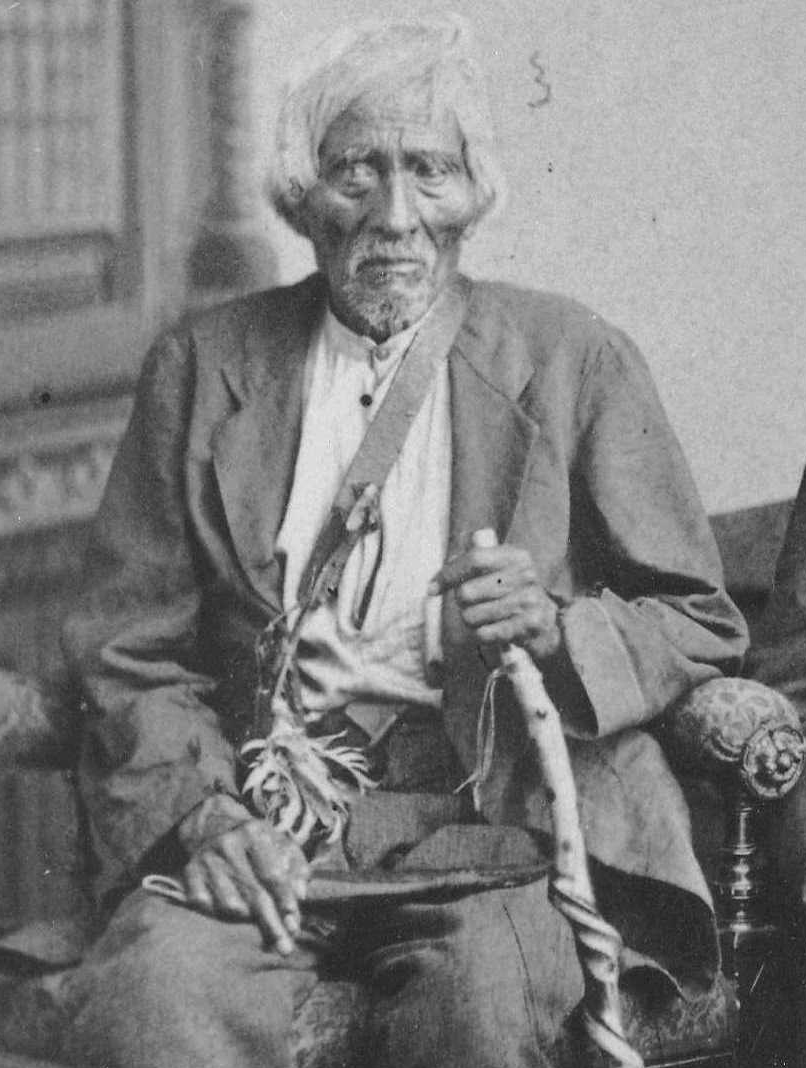
- Johnson in 1882

Mohawk leader

Personal details
- Born: December 2 or 14, 1792 Ontario, Canada
- Died: August 26, 1886 (aged 93)
- Spouse: Helen Martin (1798 – March 27, 1866)
- Children: Mary, Aaron, Joseph, William, Margret, Susannah and George Henry Martin (Onwanonsyshon), granddaughter Emily Pauline Johnson
- Parent: Tekahionwake (Jacob Johnson)
- Nickname: Smoke Johnson

John Smoke Johnson (December 2 or 14, 1792 – August 26, 1886) or Sakayengwaraton (also known as Smoke Johnson), was a Mohawk leader in Canada. After Johnson fought for the British Crown in the War of 1812, he was honoured by his tribal council as a "Pine Tree Chief", a non-hereditary position. He was influential in the Mohawk and Anglophone communities of Upper Canada.

== Early life and education ==
Smoke Johnson was born in 1792 in Ontario into the Bear clan of his Mohawk mother at the Six Nations Indian reserve. In the Mohawk matrilineal kinship system, the mother's clan and eldest brother were most important in her children's life; they took their status from her clan. His father was Jacob Tekahionwake Johnson (1758–1843). Smoke was reared in traditional Mohawk culture, but likely learned English as well.

His father Tekahionwake was born in Mohawk territory in the Province of New York in pre-Revolutionary British America, in what became the United States following the American Revolutionary War. Tekahionwake was baptized and took the name Jacob Johnson, adopting his surname from that of Sir William Johnson, the influential British Superintendent of Indian Affairs, who acted as his godfather. Jacob passed the Johnson surname down to his children. With the United States victory in the Revolutionary War, the Mohawk and other Haudenosaunee allies of the British were forced to cede their large territories in present-day New York state. They moved to Canada, where the British Crown granted them land in compensation at the Six Nations and other reserves in what is present-day Ontario.

== Marriage and family ==
Smoke Johnson married Helen Martin (1798 – March 27, 1866) of the Wolf clan. She was the daughter of Catherine Rolleston and her husband Ohyeatea, also known as George Martin. Catherine Rolleston was ethnic Dutch, but she had been captured as a girl by the Mohawk, adopted by a family in the Wolf clan, and became assimilated as Mohawk. The Johnsons had seven children, who were considered to be born into the Wolf clan: Mary, Aaron, Joseph, William, Margret, Susannah and George Henry Martin (Onwanonsyshon).

== Career ==
Johnson became a leader in Canada. He fought for the British Crown in the War of 1812 and was honored by his tribal council when chosen as a "Pine Tree Chief", a non-hereditary position. He was influential in the Mohawk and British communities of Ontario, Canada.

== Legacy ==
His son George Henry Martin Johnson was selected as a hereditary Mohawk chief of his mother's Wolf clan in the matrilineal society. Fluent in English and Mohawk, he became a leader on the Six Nations reserve and an interpreter for the Canadian government. As an informal diplomat and negotiator, he helped facilitate relations between the Native and British communities.

Johnson married Emily Howells, a native of England whose family had immigrated to the United States in 1832. They had four children, including Emily Pauline Johnson (1861–1913), who became a respected First Nations poet.

== External links and further reading ==
- Horatio Hale, "Chapter III: The Book of Rites", The Iroquois Book of Rites (1883), Gutenberg Website, references to J. S. Johnson and his son George M. Johnson
- Biography at the Dictionary of Canadian Biography Online
- O'Toole, Fintan, White Savage: William Johnson and the Invention of America; New York: Farrar, Straus and Giroux, 2005. ISBN 0-374-28128-9.
- "John Smoke Johnson", The Pauline Johnson Archive, McMaster University
