= Evelyn Johnson (poet) =

First Nations poet (1856–1937)

Helen Charlotte Eliza "Evelyn" Johnson (September 22, 1856 – June 12, 1937) was a First Nations poet, the sister of E. Pauline Johnson.

The daughter of Chief George Henry Martin Johnson and Emily Susanna Howells, she was educated at Hellmuth Ladies' College in London, Ontario. She worked in the office for the Waterous Engine Works until her mother's death in 1898, when she moved to the United States. She was matron for the Resident House at the YWCA in Troy, New York and then was assistant at the Presbyterian Convalescent Home in White Plains. Subsequently, she was employed as a lady's companion for a senator's mother in New Jersey and then as assistant to the head of the Sheltering Arms Home in Philadelphia (an institution providing care for vulnerable women, and children).

In 1912, she went to Vancouver to stay with her dying sister. Her sister Pauline died in March 1913 from breast cancer. Evelyn remained there for seven months. She then worked for a time as a lady's companion in New York City before returning to Brantford.

Johnson tried to promote the construction of a monument in Canada in memory of Tecumseh. She opposed a suggestion that some of the funds raised be diverted towards the cost of her sister's monument in Stanley Park. During World War I, the Vancouver World used funds donated by Johnson to initiate fund-raising for a machine gun for the Vancouver 29th Battalion of the Canadian Expeditionary Force; it was inscribed "Tekahionwake" (Pauline Johnson).

Meanwhile, she donated a number of items owned by her sister to the Brantford Historical Society (including personal effects and manuscripts) and also donated her family's extensive collection to the Royal Ontario Museum. Johnson criticized archaeologist David Boyle for presenting what she felt was a distorted view of Six Nations culture.

She died in Brantford at the age of 80 and was buried at the Mohawk Chapel.
