= Skull and crossbones (fraternities and sports) =

Fraternal motif

The skull and crossbones was a common fraternal motif as a symbol of mortality and warning in the late nineteenth and early twentieth centuries. The symbol was adopted, for various reasons, by many sporting teams, clubs, and societies in both America and Europe.

== Adoption by societies ==
The skull and crossbones motif was used by many American college fraternities, sororities, and secret societies founded in the nineteenth and twentieth centuries. The most well-known example of this usage is Skull and Bones, a secret society at Yale University which derives its very name from the symbol. Other well-known college fraternal organizations which use the skull and bones in some capacity in their public symbols include but are not limited to Delta Sigma Pi, Kappa Sigma, Sigma Phi Epsilon, Phi Kappa Sigma, Tau Kappa Epsilon, Chi Psi and Zeta Beta Tau Fraternities and Sigma Sigma Sigma, Chi Omega, and Kappa Delta Sororities. Other fraternal groups also use the skull and crossbones in their symbolism or their secret fraternal rituals, including the Knights of Columbus, the Royal Black Institution, Apprentice Boys of Derry, and the Knights Templar degree of Freemasonry.

In fraternal usage, the skull and crossbones – along with full skeletons and the skull alone – are a very common motif due to their common association with death. The significance of these symbols varies from group to group. For some, they are a symbolic reminder of mortality. For others, the symbol has a religious reference (as with the Masonic Knights Templar, for which the skull and bones symbolize Golgotha, the place of Jesus' crucifixion). Another common fraternal use is one of warning wherein the skull and crossbones symbolize a dire warning against betraying the group's secrets and/or failing to keep one's oath.

== Adoption by sporting teams ==
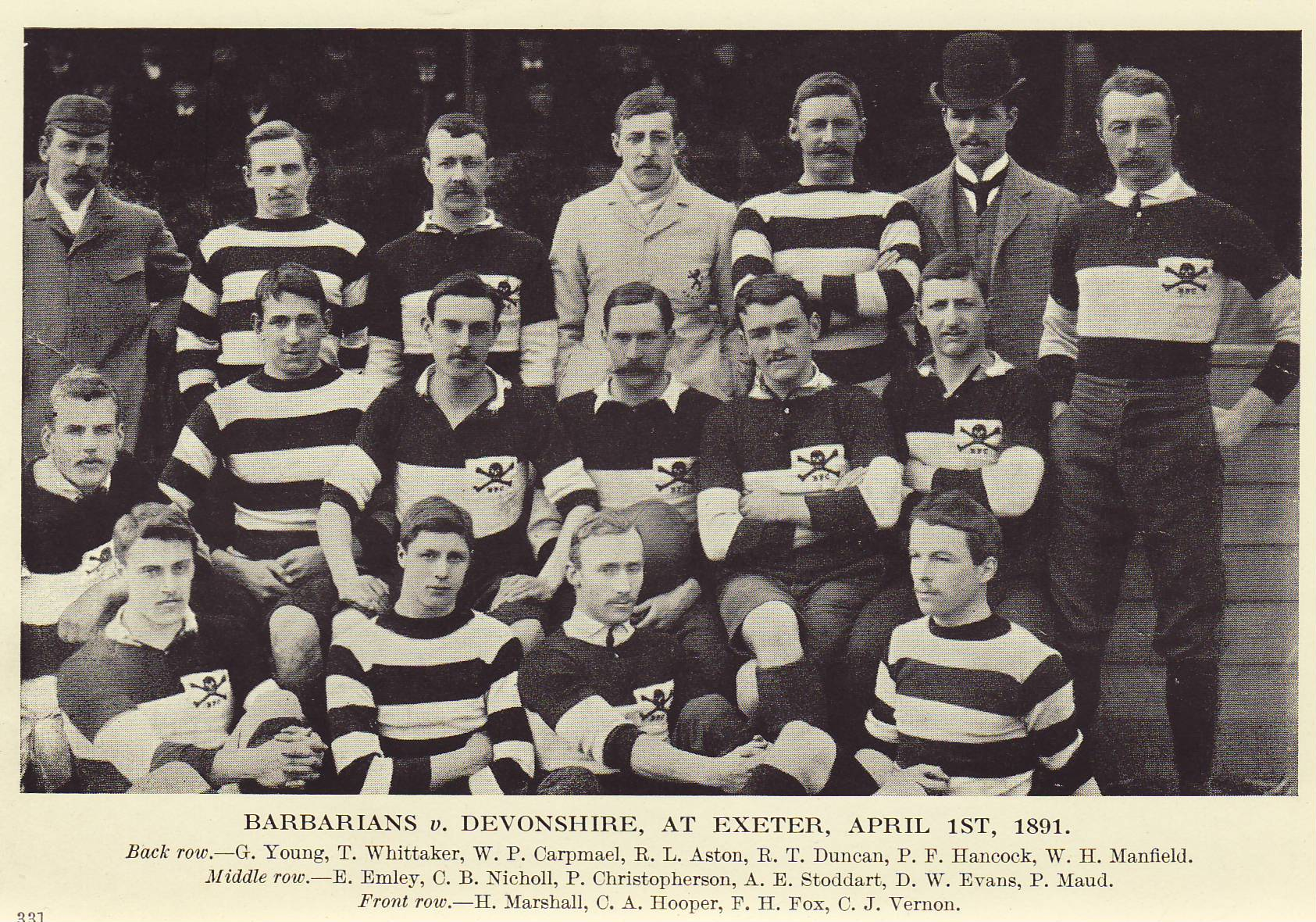
Barbarians team that faced Exeter, April 1891

In sports, the symbol was first adopted in the 1870s. It was popular across many football sports in Great Britain and is still widely used by modern sports teams. The earliest teams to adopt the skull and crossbones were rugby union teams of the time. Although some coastal teams adopted an association with pirates in their team name, most teams used the symbol simply as a form of rebellion and its connotation with danger. The first Cardiff RFC team adopted a white skull and crossbones on the team's black strip in 1876, but this was changed the next season after pressure from the players' parents. The symbol was also used by the invitational touring rugby team the Barbarians, but this was dropped for the black and white hoops by the late 1890s.

In Ireland, the University College Cork, has used the skull and crossbones laid over the University badge for many of its sporting teams, most notably the College rugby team. Although there is a dispute as to the origin of the adoption of the badge, it is believed that the University's past connection as a medical school may have been the reason for its use. The University College even references the skull and crossbones in their College Victory Cry.

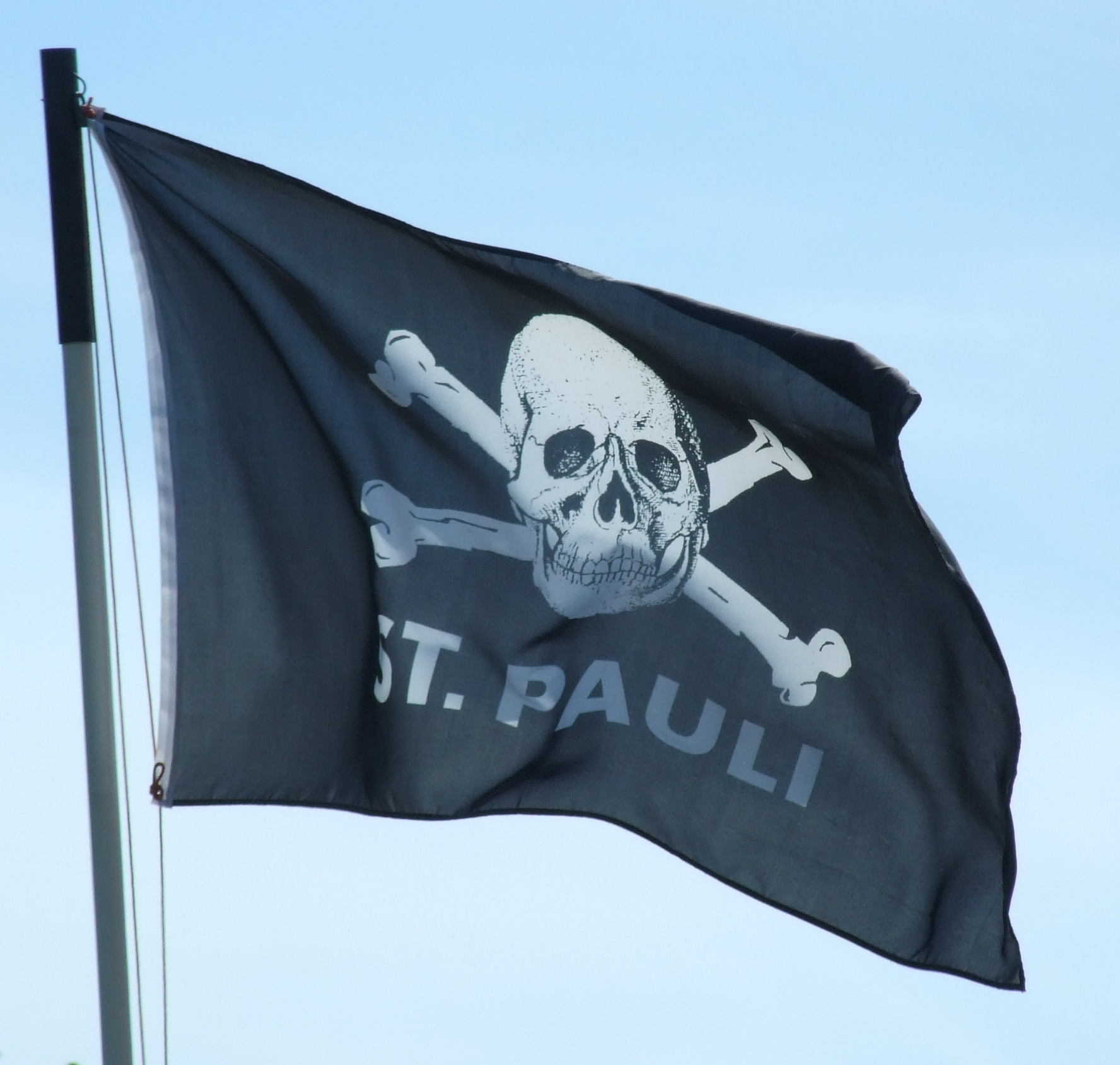
The Skull and crossbones on a St Pauli supporters flag.

Poole Pirates Speedway Team in the United Kingdom have the Skull and Crossbones as their team badge.

The logo of the Blackshirts, the starting defensive unit for the Nebraska Cornhuskers football team, is a Skull and Crossbones with the skull wearing the team helmet. Additionally, the players and fans often celebrate by "throwing the bones", where they cross the forearms in the air, in an 'X', imitating the logo.

FC St. Pauli supporters adopted the Skull and Crossbones as an unofficial club symbol.

The athletic teams of East Carolina University, nicknamed Pirates, use a modified skull and crossbones flag as their symbol. (The skull wears a purple tricornered hat.)
