= Putnam Hall School =

Defunct girls boarding school

Putnam Hall School (opened for pupils Sept 1871; closed 1940) is a bygone notable nonsectarian boarding school for girls formerly located in Poughkeepsie, New York.

== History ==
Predecessor school, Brooks Seminary

Putnam Hall was the successor to an earlier nonsectarian girls boarding school on the same property. It was named Brooks Seminary for Young Ladies. Brooks Seminary was founded September 1871 – not long after the opening of Vassar College. Mary Bryan Johnson (maiden) was its founder. She and her future husband, Edward White, erected a building on six acres of elevated grounds in the southeastern section of Poughkeepsie at the corner of what then was Southeast and Hanscom Avenues. Due to competition from Vassar Preparatory School, Brooks Seminary moved to 11 Montague Terrace, Brooklyn, New York, around 1880. The last news article of a Brooks Seminary commencement was June 11, 1881 — New York Herald-Tribune.

Putnam Hall School

After an interval of use as a hotel and Vassar dormitory, the Poughkeepsie building and property again launched as a new girls' boarding school in about 1901 under the name of Putnam Hall.

Bartlett Park

Miss Ellen Clizbe Bartlett, who presided as proprietor and principal of Putnam Hall when it closed in 1940, donated the six acres to the city of Poughkeepsie. It is now a city park, known as Bartlett Park.

== Former directors and leadership ==
Directors and leadership of Brooks Seminary

- Edmund P. Platt (b. 2 Dec 1843; Poughkeepsie), director
- Mary Bryan White née Johnson, proprietor & head of school, Brooks Seminary
- Mrs. Hanks (capacity not known)
- Amy Johnson, teacher
- Miss Minna Hinkle ( –1929), teacher of French and German

Directors and leadership of Putnam Hall School

- Miss Ellen Clizbe Bartlett (A.B., Elmira College) (1864–1944), principal since 1905 and connected with the school since 1901
