= Peter Gustav Zwilgmeyer =

Norwegian politician

- Born: 6 January 1813
- Died: 14 June 1887 (aged 74)
- Occupations: Stipendiary magistrate Politician
- Known for: Member of the Storting
- Spouse: Margrethe Giørwel Daae
- Children: Dikken Zwilgmeyer
- Relatives: Ludvig Daae (brother-in-law)

Peter Gustav Zwilgmeyer (6 January 1813 – 14 June 1887) was a Norwegian stipendiary magistrate and politician.

Zwilgmeyer was elected representative to the Storting from Østerrisør for the period 1865–1867. He was the father of children's writer Dikken Zwilgmeyer.
