= Dikken Zwilgmeyer =

Norwegian writer (1853–1913)

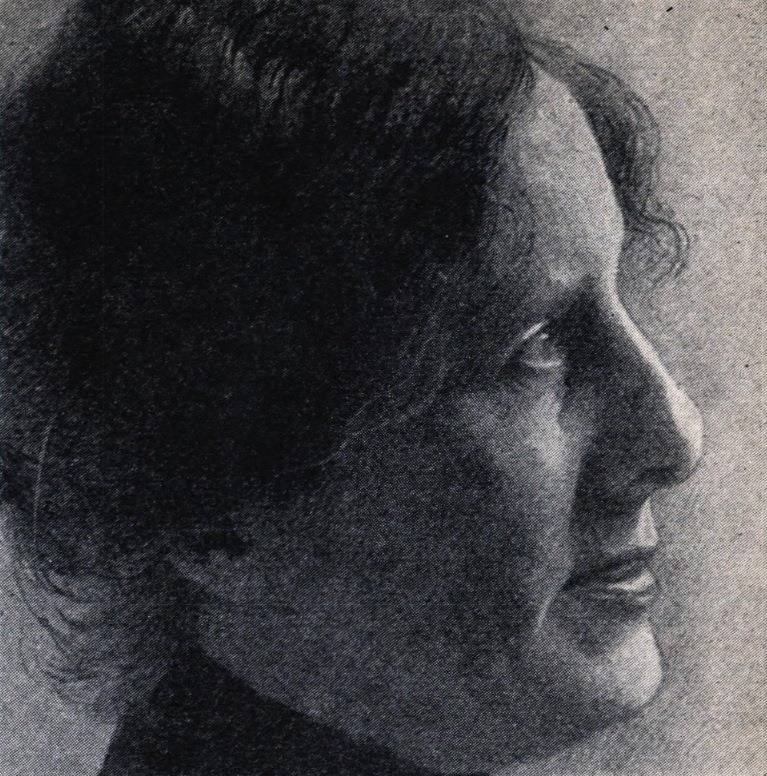
- Born: Barbara Hendrikke Wind Daae Zwilgmeyer; 20 September 1853; Trondheim, Norway
- Died: 28 February 1913 (aged 59); Kongsberg, Norway
- Occupation: Children's writer
- Known for: "Inger Johanne" series of books
- Notable work: Anniken Præstgaren (1900)
- Parent: Peter Gustav Zwilgmeyer
- Relatives: Ludvig Daae (uncle)

Dikken Zwilgmeyer (20 September 1853 – 28 February 1913) was a Norwegian fiction writer. She is most noted for her children's literature and for her "Inger Johanne" series of books.

== Personal life ==
Barbara Hendrikke Wind Daae Zwilgmeyer was born in Trondheim, Norway. She was one of seven children born to Peter Gustav Zwilgmeyer (1813–1887) and Margrethe Gjørvel Daae (1825–1887). Her father was a Stipendiary magistrate and Member of the Norwegian Parliament. She and her family lived in Risør in Nedenes county from the time she was 8 years old. Her uncle Ludvig Daae was a politician and Minister of the Army. Her grandfather, Heinrich Carl Zwilgmeyer (1761–1850) had immigrated to Norway from Hanover, Germany. She never married. She died at Kongsberg in Buskerud and was buried at Vår Frelsers gravlund in Oslo.

== Career ==
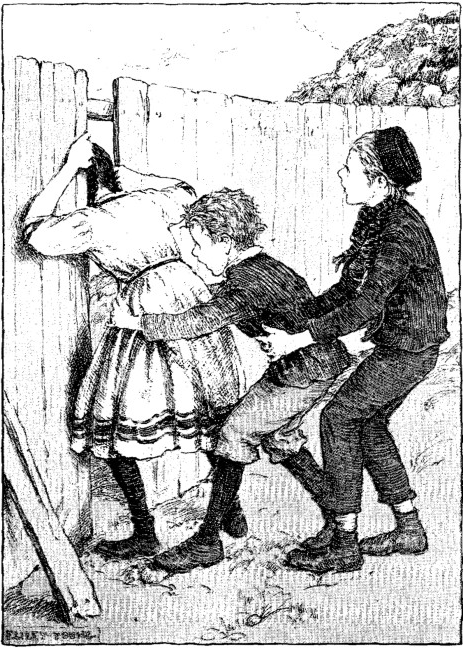
Inger Johanne gets her head stuck in the fence of a chicken yard on Midsummer's eve. What Happened to Inger Johanne (p.67), translated by Emilie Poulsson, illustrated by Florence Liley Young (1919)

Zwilgmeyer had no formal education. She showed early talent for painting and writing, and took lessons with various painters, including Christian Krohg. Her first published story was "En Hverdagshistorie", printed in the magazine Nyt Tidsskrift in 1884. Her first story for children was "Afbrudt 17. mai", published in the magazine Illustreret Tidende for Børn.

Her first children's book was Vi børn from 1890. It written under the pseudonym "Inger Johanne, 13 years old". Inger Johanne was described as the daughter of a judge in a small Norwegian town. This book became a great success, and eleven more "Inger Johanne" books followed. Among these are Karsten og jeg from 1891, Fra vor by from 1892, and Barndom from 1895. Anniken Præstgaren from 1900 is probably the book with largest audience. It is estimated that Zwilgmeyer's books were printed in 600,000 copies up to 1903. "Inger Johanne" remained a favourite for Norwegian children for generations, and Zwilgmeyer's books are regarded as a significant innovation of Norwegian children's literature around 1900.

In 1895 she published her first book for adults, the short story collection Som kvinder er, about the poor circumstances for unmarried women, and in 1896 the puberty novel Ungt sind. These books were more or less met with silence from the contemporary literary critic. The collection Som kvinder er was reissued in 1953, and then received as a forgotten literary pearl from the 1890s. In the 1900s she wrote historical novels and stories, including the collection Mægler Porsvold og andre historier from 1902, and the novels Emerentze (1906), Maren Ragna (1907) and Thekla (1908).

In an obituary from 1913, Sigrid Undset emphasized Zwilgmeyer's two faces, the nice children's writer and the more bitter critic of society.

What Happened to Inger Johanne was a compilation of short stories translated into English by American children's author Emilie Poulsson. Accompanied with illustrations by Florence Liley Young (1872–1974), the English language version was published in Boston in 1919.

== Selected works ==
- Vi børn (We children), 1890
- Karsten og jeg (Karsten and I), 1891
- Fra vor by (From our city), 1892
- Sommerferier (Summer holidays), 1894
- Barndom (Childhood), 1895
- Morsomme dage (Funny days), 1896
- Hos onkel Max og tante Betty (With Uncle Max and Aunt Betty), 1897
- Udenlands (Foreign), 1898
- Fire kusiner (Four cousins), 1899
- Anniken Prestgaren (Anniken the Prestige), 1900
- Syvstjernen og andre historier (Seven Star and Other Stories), 1900
- Frøken Lybæks pensionatskole (Ms. Lybæk's boarding school), 1901
- Lille Jan Bluhme (Little Jan Bluhme; Johnny Blossom), 1903
- Kongsgaardgutten (Kongsgaardgutten), 1904
- Maja (Maja), 1905
- Hos farfar paa Løvly (At grandfather at Løvly), 1910
- Vi tre i hytten (We were in the cabin), 1911

== Other sources ==
- Harald S. Naess, editor (1993) A History of Norwegian Literature (University of Nebraska Press) ISBN 9780803233171
