= Meguid =

Meguid (Arabic: مجيد), extended form Abdel Meguid (Arabic: عبد المجيد), is an Egyptian surname.

Notable people with this surname include:

- Abdel Meguid Amir (born 1961), Egyptian basketball player
- Abdel Meguid Mahmoud (born 1946), Egyptian politician
- Ahmed Abdel-Meguid, (1923-2013), Egyptian diplomat
- Ibrahim Abdel Meguid, Egyptian author
- Michael M. Meguid, Egyptian-American surgeon
- Nagwa Abdel Meguid, Egyptian geneticist
- Omar Abdel Meguid (born 1988), Egyptian squash player
- Wahid Abdel Meguid, Egyptian politician
