= NutritionDay =

Malnutrition movement

"nutritionDay worldwide" is a large scale, worldwide action project designed to reduce disease-related malnutrition among hospitalised patients and nursing home residents. The aim of this project is to increase awareness and knowledge regarding disease-related malnutrition in hospitalised patients and the elderly.

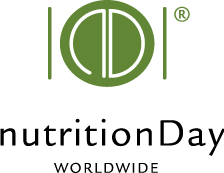
An initiative to raise awareness for disease-related malnutrition

== Background ==
In 1977 poor nutritional status and malnutrition was already detected in surgical patients. Still, disease-related malnutrition is a much underrated public health issue and has also become an enormous economical concern. It is estimated that over 50 million Europeans are at risk. A study performed in the UK in 2005 estimated the cost of malnutrition to the UK to be €10.6 b per year, double the projected €5.1 b cost of obesity. Two population groups are at particularly high risk: hospitalized patients and residents of nursing homes.

Disease-related malnutrition can be responsible for a prolonged hospital stay, morbidity and premature mortality in hospitalized patients. Research has shown that approximately 31% of all hospitalized patients can be considered malnourished or at nutritional risk.

Previous nutritionDay studies have shown that malnutrition is a major health concern that still gets too little attention in hospitals and nursing homes. Malnutrition, as it has been shown in many studies, increases infection rates, affects the patient's wound healing, leads to cardiac complications, and also prolongs hospital stay.

== Obesity and Disease related Malnutrition ==
Generally health care focuses mainly on the increasing incidence of obesity. Initially, health providers believed only patients with low body weight or low body mass index (BMI < 18.5 kg/m2) could be malnourished. However, studies show that BMI is not always a good parameter to detect malnutrition, and other screening tools should be used. Analysis shows that a high percentage of body fat reduces the sensitivity of BMI to detect nutritional depletion.

== Disease related Malnutrition in Hospitals ==
Internationally, the issue of disease-related malnutrition was raised in various forums, most clearly in the adoption of a resolution by the Council of Europe. Resolution ResAP (2003)3 on Food and Nutritional Care in Hospitals of the Committee of Ministers of the Council of Europe emphasizes inter alia the unacceptable number of undernourished people in hospitals and the beneficial effects of adequate food service and nutritional care in hospitals on patients’ recovery and quality of life. The resolution identifies a long list of actions to be undertaken to remedy the situation.

== nutritionDay worldwide – The Project ==
The project “nutritionDay worldwide” addresses improved patient safety and quality of care by raising awareness and increasing knowledge about disease-related malnutrition. NutritionDay establishes a worldwide chart in which nutritional status and prevalence of malnutrition are portrayed. Further, it documents relevant nutritional infrastructures in hospitals and nursing homes. The aim of the project is to emphasize the importance of adequate clinical nutrition in both settings.

In January 2006 the project was conducted for the first time under the direction of Univ. Prof. Dr. Michael Hiesmayr (Medical University of Vienna) with support of the Austrian Society of Clinical Nutrition (AKE) and the European Society for Clinical Nutrition and Metabolism (ESPEN). A subsequent audit took place in January, 2007, when the project was extended to intensive care units (ICU) and nursing homes. Since then, nutritionDay is performed in all 3 settings. In 2012 “oncology nutritionDay” was performed as the first disease-specific nutritionDay.

The audit is unit and patient-centered. Information about the actual nutrition care and nutrition monitoring on participating wards is gathered using four questionnaires. This happens on one single day worldwide.

The hospital ward as an organizational unit is of particular interest. The ward, with all its specific characteristics and local culture, is the direct centre of care for a group of patients within the hospital.

The direct interview of patients is a characteristic specific to “nutritionDay project”. Ward patients are surveyed about their eating habits on the day (“how much of your meal did you eat?”) and about the reasons for not eating.

== Transnational multilingual Approach ==
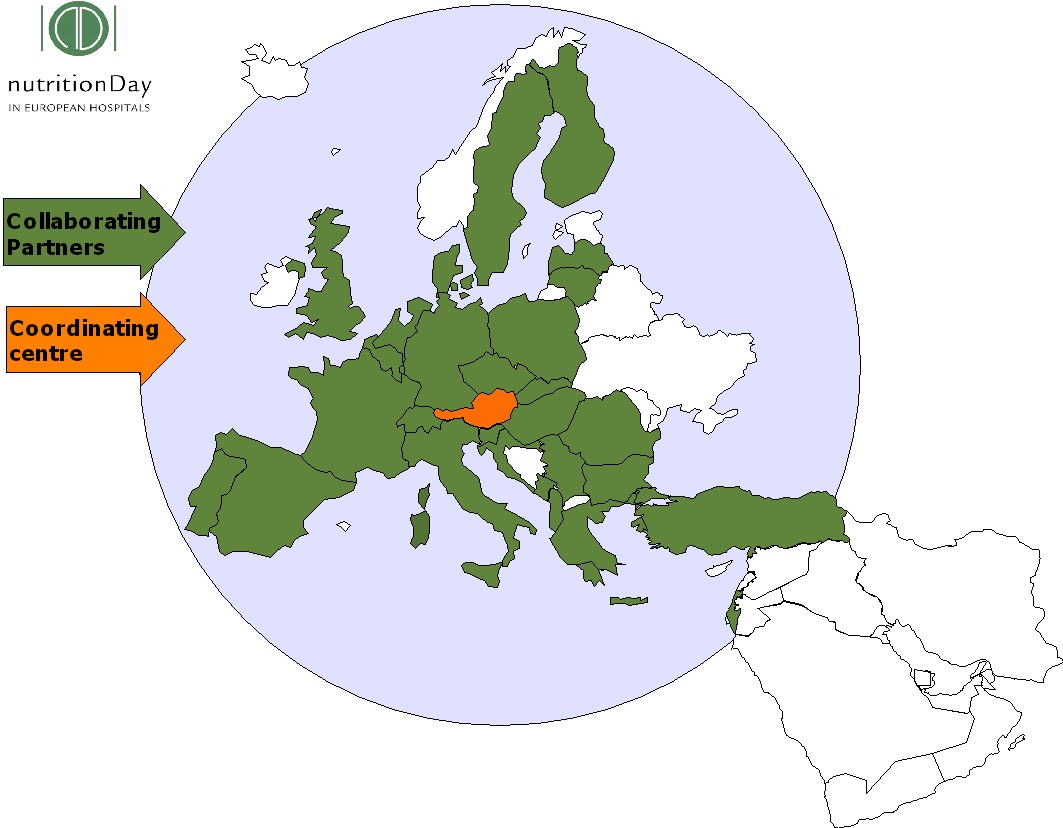
Hospitals and nursing homes of 51 countries worldwide participated in nutritionDay

Hospital wards and nursing homes from 51 countries have already participated in nutritionDay. In January, 2013, the nutritionDay database counts more than 132.000 datasets from patients and nursing home residents.

The questionnaires are available in over 30 languages. This enables the project to include minority groups of patients (e.g. immigrants, non-native speakers).

== Performance of the nutritionDay audit ==
On one specific first or second Thursday in November, the “nutritionDay” takes place every year. On this day, participating hospital wards and nursing homes collect data on the nutritional status of their patients and residents and record supply structures relevant for nutritional care. Thus, participants receive an actual snapshot of their hospital unit or nursing home. After a specified period (30 days for ward patients, 60 days for ICU patients and 6 months for nursing home residents) of time, a follow-up evaluation is performed which gives information on the patients’ outcome.

After data collection, the hospital staff transfers the data into a database that is accessible over the website http://www.nutritionday.org. An individual code guarantees anonymity of participants. Promoting compliance with HIPPA (Patient privacy act)

Each unit receives an online feedback report about its nutritional care position compared to all other participating units of the same specialty type. Repeated participation in the audit allows benchmarking designed to enhance learning within units and to track changes in local practice and international trends.

== nutritionDay questionnaires ==
Based on four to five questionnaires (available on nutritionDay.org), information of the participating hospital units or nursing home and their patients and residents is collected. Of particular interest are the unit organization and structure, health status and nutritional care of the patients, weight monitoring, and food intake. The unit acts as direct care unit of a group of patients with all its specific characteristics, its occupational group, its patient's population, and the local culture is from special interest. A characteristic of the project is the direct interview with the patient about their nutritional behavior on nutritionDay and if there were reasons for not eating.

== nutritionDay Oncology ==
Nutritional treatment plays an important role for patients who suffer from cancer. In studies it has been shown that weight stable cancer patients have a better prognosis than cancer patients with weight loss: in concrete, a lower number of treatment-related adverse reactions in weight stable patients is reported, the response to cancer treatment is increased, the patient reports a higher activity level and a better subjective quality of life.

Moreover, the actual survival rate of weight stable patients is higher compared to patients with weight loss.

The importance of nutritional treatment of cancer patients was reason to appoint "nutritionDay oncology“ the first disease-specific focus of the nutritionDay audit for the years 2012 and 2013.

The project "nutritionDay oncology“, comprises three additional questionnaires which collect nutritional data of patients who suffer from cancer. Data obtained from "nutritionDay oncology“ will be incorporated into the new ESPEN (European Society for Clinical nutrition and Metabolism) guidelines and thus increase their practical worth.

== nutritionDay Objectives ==
The overall objective of the nutritionDay project is to promote healthy nutrition practices worldwide by increasing knowledge, awareness, and nutrition monitoring and to bring attention to the importance of nutritional care for the patient's recovery. Further nutritionDay shall raise awareness of the interaction between food intake and recovery. Target groups are health care professionals as well as patients, their relatives and political and economical stakeholders.

- Gathering knowledge about inadequate food intake in the three settings hospitals, nursing homes, and intensive care units in relation to risk factors, medical specialty type, organizational units, and countries.
- Decrease human suffering and reduce community costs.
- Initiate research for “eating despite illness” and the ideal utilization of clinical nutrition.

== Benefits for health facilities ==
- Participating units receive a unit report with an international benchmark which allows a comparison between similar units worldwide. On basis of the received data, actions and consequences can be derived individually.
- Repeated participation enables a continuous quality improvement process by pursuing targeted actions.
- The participation in the project Nutrition Day facilitates a good food supply in your hospital or nursing home and increases the attention for the topic around nutrition and malnutrition.
- A repeated participation documents a development of the nutritional situation over years and provides an anonymous international comparison within your specialty.

== nutritionDay findings ==
The nutritionDay study is conducted to determine the effects of nutritional factors on the outcomes of hospitalized patients and nursing homes. There were 3 papers publish from 2009 to 2010 on this topic.

An analysis of the data of the nutritionDay audit 2006 performed by Hiesmayr et al. (2009) revealed that less than half of all patients in European hospitals included in the audit eat less than provided as regular meal. Further, an association of reduced food intake with an increased risk of mortality in patients after 30 days was found. Reduced food intake can therefore be seen as a risk factor for hospital mortality.

In 2009, Valentini et al. analyzed the data of the nutritionDay in nursing homes in 2007 and described the effects of 'nD' of first time participants. Therein outcome results indicated that nutritionDay participation induces behavioural changes such as awareness in malnutrition.

Schindler et Al conducted a study based on the data of the nutritionDay audit of the years 2007 and 2008. Core findings of this study on “how nutritional risk is assessed and managed in European hospitals” indicate that still an inconsistent way of assessing nutritional risk in patients in different units and countries exists and that frequently energy goals of patients are not met.
