= Islam in Hawaii =

Islam is a minority religion in Hawaii. Of the entire population of Hawaii, about 0.05% are Muslim.

== History ==
=== Kingdom era ===
Records from the Hawaiian Kingdom's Ministry of Interior from 1844-1894 have shown Muslim names of some naturalized citizens, such as Ali and Abdullah, who originated from Colonial India as Lascars (Hawaiian: laka) under the service of the British, which Hawaiʻi had diplomatic relations with.

=== Post-American statehood ===
Hawaii organized its first official body in 1979, with the incorporation of the Muslim Students' Association of Hawaii, though the organization had been operational as early as 1968. The group initially prayed in a cottage, before purchasing the Manoa Mosque in the 1979–1980 period. However, a 1992 study by the American Muslim Support group listed zero mosques in Hawaii in 1992.

As of early 2001, the Manoa Mosque was mentioned as having a Friday Prayer attendance of 200 men, the end of Ramadan iftar meal as having 700 attendees, and the mosque itself as having 2,000 members.

== Population ==
According to a 2017 estimate, there are around 5,000 Muslims living in Hawaii. This corresponds to much less than 1% of the entire population of 1,455,271. Hawaiian Muslims are racially diverse, consisting of American-born converts, as well as those with familial ties to many regions of the world like Asia and the Middle East. The first Muslims appeared in Hawaii as far back as the 19th century.

== Islam Day observance ==
In May 2009, Hawaiian legislators voted to create a state-designated day of recognition, Islam Day, in order to recognize "the rich religious, scientific, cultural and artistic contributions of the Islamic world." The resolution was approved in the State Senate by a 22–3 vote, and designated September 24, 2009 as a day of recognition for Muslims in Hawaii

== Islamic art ==
The Shangri La mansion, built by Doris Duke in 1937, serves as a repository for over 2,500 pieces of Islamic art, as well as the Islamic architecture embodied in the building itself. The building is now operated by the Doris Duke Foundation for Islamic Art, with tours in cooperation with the Honolulu Museum of Art.

== Education ==
The Philosophy Department of the University of Hawaii at Manoa, where the state’s main mosque is located, offers an Undergraduate Certificate in Islamic Studies.

== See also ==
- Muslim Association of Hawaii
- Religion in Hawaii
