= Hakim Ouansafi =

Hakim Ouansafi is a volunteer chairman for the Muslim Association of Hawaii. He is also a volunteer board member for the Hawaii chapter of the federal law enforcement foundation and is a civil service commissioner with the city and county of Honolulu.

Ouansafi is the executive director of the State of Hawaii Housing Authority.

== See also ==
- Islam Day in Hawaii
- Islam in Hawaii
