= Paracelsus Recovery =

Rehabilitation and mental health treatment facility

- Type: Private
- Industry: Healthcare
- Founded: 2012
- Founder: Jan Gerber
- Headquarters: Zurich, Switzerland
- Area served: Worldwide
- Website: paracelsus-recovery.com

Paracelsus Recovery is a rehabilitation and mental health treatment facility based in Zürich, Switzerland. It has been described as one of the most expensive rehabilitation centers in the world.

== History ==
Paracelsus Recovery was founded in 2012 by Jan Gerber and his family. Gerber had previously co-founded another Swiss rehabilitation center, the Kusnacht Practice, in 2011. Initially self-funded, Paracelsus Recovery focused on providing discreet services internationally. It is named after a 16th-century Swiss physician, Paracelsus.

By 2018, Paracelsus Recovery had expanded its operations to include services in London.

== Treatment ==
Paracelsus Recovery utilizes a one-person-at-a-time model. Each person is treated individually with privacy. Treatment programs are customized for each individual and typically last four to eight weeks. Upon admission, a person undergoes extensive medical and psychiatric evaluations. Treatment plans integrate psychotherapy, psychiatric care, detoxification, and nutritional therapy. The clinic treats conditions such as addiction, depression, anxiety, and burnout at its Zürich facility or at off-site locations.

== Facilities ==
Paracelsus Recovery operates from three apartments and an adjacent clinic on Lake Zurich. Previously, it also operated a facility in London.

== See also ==
- Drug rehabilitation
