= Shangri La (Doris Duke) =

Islamic-style mansion in Hawaii

Coordinates: 21°15′24″N 157°47′41″W

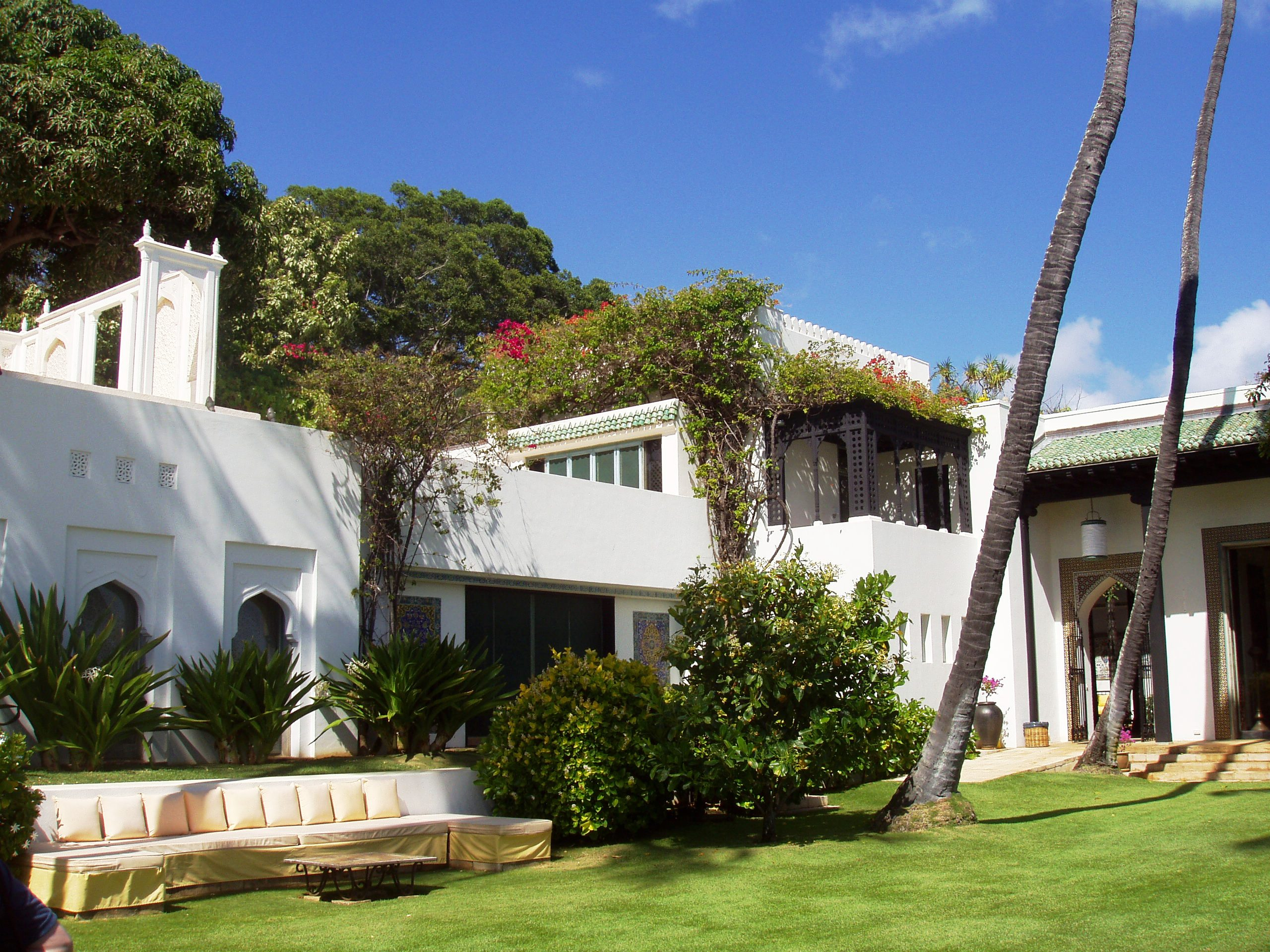
Exterior view

The Shangri La Museum of Islamic Art, Culture & Design is housed in the former home of Doris Duke near Diamond Head in Honolulu, Hawaii. It is owned and operated as a public museum of the arts and cultures of the Islamic world by the Doris Duke Foundation for Islamic Art (DDFIA), a branch of the Doris Duke Foundation. Guided tours depart from the Honolulu Museum of Art, which operates the tours in cooperation with DDFIA.

Shangri La was built between 1936 and 1938 after Duke's honeymoon, which took her through the Islamic world. Her travels in Egypt, India, and the Middle East inspired her to design a home that reflected the beauty, diversity, and craftsmanship of Islamic art and architecture. Her experiences in North Africa and South and Southeast Asia also shaped her vision of combining Islamic design with the natural landscape of Hawaiʻi.

For nearly 60 years, Duke commissioned and collected artworks for the space, eventually forming a collection of over 4,000 objects. The structure was designed by Marion Sims Wyeth, and Duke personally collaborated with artisans to incorporate Moroccan ceilings, Persian tilework, and Mughal-style gardens into the home's design. Over time, she expanded her collection to nearly 4,500 works, especially ceramics, wood, glass, and textiles from 1600 to 1940.

An artistic reflection of Shangri La's construction appears in Kiana Davenport's novel Song of the Exile. In 2002, the building opened to the public as the Shangri La Museum for Islamic Art, Design & Culture. It remains the only US museum dedicated exclusively to Islamic art, and fulfills Duke's wish that Shangri La be open to students, scholars, and others interested in the appreciation and study of Islamic art.

== Collections and exhibitions ==
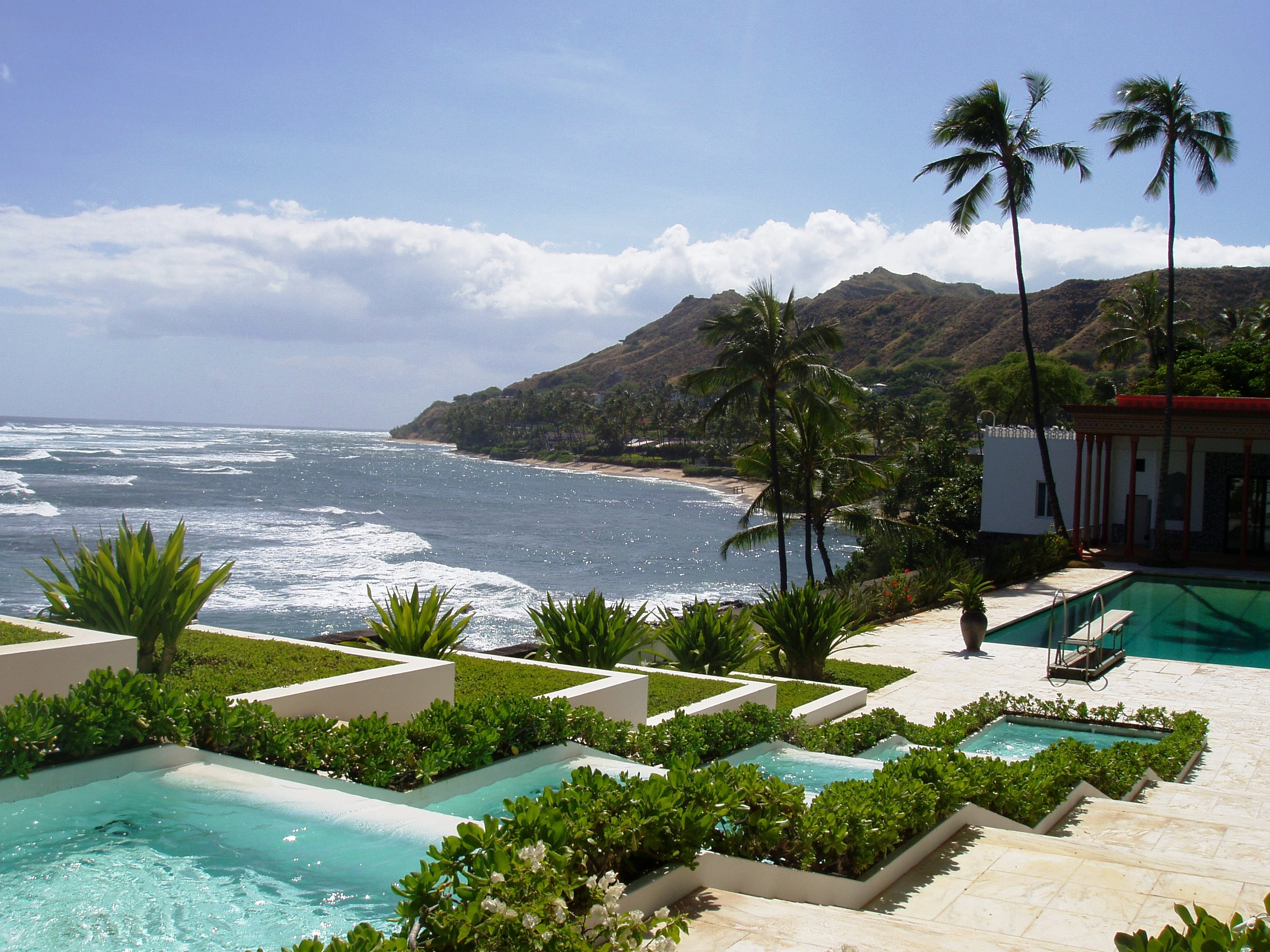
Pool view with Diamond Head, Hawaii

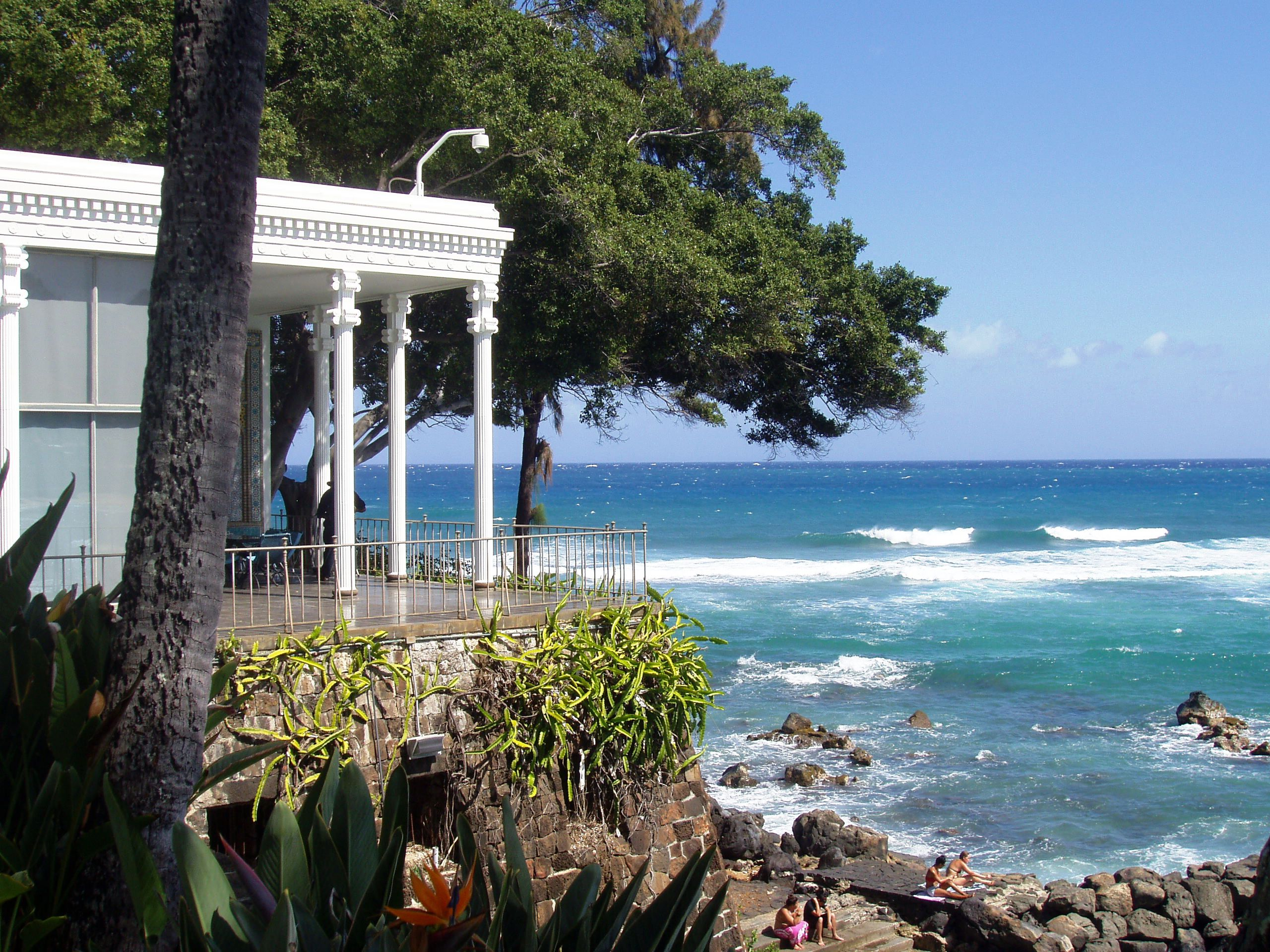
Sea view

The museum displays a wide-ranging collection of art, furnishings, and built-in architectural elements from Iran, Morocco, Turkey, Spain, Syria, Egypt, and India - among others. Gilt and painted ceilings from Morocco, vivid ceramics from Iran (including the only complete lusterware Ilkhanid mihrab in North America), painted wooden interiors from Syria, pierced metalwork and vibrant textiles from Spain to India (including a magnificent pair of shaped carpets, made for the Mughal emperor) are among the many highlights. Its multiple buildings on the campus also include The Playhouse (a reduced-scale version of the 17th century Chehel Sotoun in Esfahan, Iran, now used for public programs and artist residencies).

One of Duke's most notable artworks is the mihrab from Kashan, Iran. This piece is the best preserved of the six that remain. It showcases Duke's Orientalism. Duke did not show it for decades, obviating its function as a prayer rug.

The outdoor landscaping has several gardens, including a formal Mughal garden inspired by the Shalimar Gardens, terraced water features, a Hawaiian fishpond, tropical gardens, a waterfall, and vistas of the Pacific Ocean.

The museum also hosts two visual artists per year for exhibitions, workshops, and/or lectures. Featured artists have included Hayv Kahraman, Faig Ahmed, Bahia Shehab, and Reem Bassous.

== Architecture design and preservation ==
Constructed between 1936 and 1938 for Duke by architect Marion Sims Wyeth, Shangri La was designed as a one-story residence combining modernist architecture with elements drawn from Islamic design traditions. The estate integrates indoor and outdoor spaces through courtyards, pavilions, and oceanfront terraces, while incorporating materials and artworks from regions including Iran, India, and Morocco.

Duke's continuing redesigns throughout her life introduced replicated and commissioned works alongside historical pieces, reflecting her interest in mobility, transitional spaces, and the blending of architecture with the surrounding landscape. By the 1960s, she had reconfigured several rooms, such as the dining area, into tent-like interiors inspired by Islamic models, illustrating the estate's ongoing transformation into a hybrid dwelling of art and architecture.

== Location ==
Shangri La sits on a 4.9-acre (20,000 m²) oceanfront lot in the Black Point residential neighborhood near Diamond Head. All tours to Shangri La begin and end at the Honolulu Museum of Art, which occupies 3.2 acres (13,000 m²) near downtown Honolulu.

Shangri La also serves as a center for learning and cultural sharing, hosting artists, scholars, and educators through residencies and community programs that promote understanding of Islamic art and design. As it operates under the terms of a conditional use permit from the City and County of Honolulu, visitor access is restricted. Visitors may not drive or park on site or in the surrounding neighborhood.

The museum's oceanfront setting and blend of architecture, landscape, and ocean views reflect Duke's vision of experiencing Islamic art in a living, natural environment.

== Public tours and programs ==
Because it is in a residential area with limited parking capacity, tours of Shangri La originate at the Honolulu Museum of Art, and tickets must be reserved well in advance. Individual access to the museum is not granted. Visitors must follow the museum's rules, and shuttle buses from the Honolulu Museum of Art or Bishop Museum help protect the privacy of the nearby neighborhood.

Tours last about two and a half hours, with one and a half hours at Shangri La. Tours feature the public rooms of the museum and parts of the grounds, including the Entry Courtyard with Bahia Shehab's mural "My People", the Mughal Garden, the covered lānai overlooking the ocean, and views of the Playhouse, pool, and water cascades. Shangri La also offers self-guided visits, where guests may explore the museum at their own pace. Staff members are available to share information and answer questions about the art.

Shangri La also offers a virtual tour online that shows its art, architecture, and ocean views.

The museum holds events including classes, talks, and shows by artists who stay there, such as musicians, dancers, comedians, and scholars. These events help people connect and learn about different cultures through art and creativity.

== Scholarly perspectives and cultural representation ==
Academic analysis has examined Shangri La in the specific categories of the museum's representation, reception from visitors, and the cultural politics surrounding privately owned collections of Islamic art in Western countries. Sociologist and Head of the Department of Peace Studies at Payap University, Suchart Setthamalinee, argues that the site better represents Duke's personal taste and identity than Islamic art traditions, noting that a tour of Shangri La emphasizes Duke's biography over the historical and cultural contexts of the pieces on display.

The study also found that many visitors come to experience the estate's association with Duke's wealth and celebrity rather than the art, shaping the way the art is interpreted at the museum. Setthamalinee notes that certain display choices, such as the placement of religious architectural elements, raise questions about the effects of American Orientalism on Islamic art in Western private museums. But two Muslim community leaders with the Muslim Association of Hawaii who were interviewed for the study said they viewed Shangri La as a site with the potential to foster public understanding of Islamic art and culture.
