= Michael M. Meguid =

Egyptian-born American professor of surgery

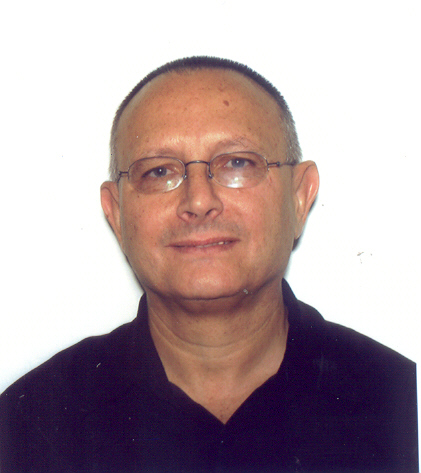
- Born: May 14, 1944 (age 82); Egypt
- Education: University of London (M.D., 1968); Harvard Medical School (1972); Massachusetts Institute of Technology (Ph.D., 1981)
- Occupation: Surgeon
- Known for: Retracting Ranjit Kumar Chandra's paper from Nutrition
- Awards: Fellow of the International Behavioral Neuroscience Society and European Society for Clinical Nutrition and Metabolism
- Scientific career
- Fields: Obesity, neuroscience, nutrition, biochemistry
- Workplaces: Upstate Medical University; The State University of New York

Michael M. Meguid is Professor of Surgery Emeritus at Upstate Medical University (The State University of New York) in Syracuse, New York. He is the founder and editor-in-chief of Nutrition: The International Journal of Applied and Basic Nutrition Sciences.

== Biography ==
Born in Egypt, Michael Marwan Meguid spent his childhood in Egypt, Germany, and then England. There he attended University College London (UCL) and University College Hospital Medical School, graduating with his MBBS degree in 1968. For the next two years he was an Anatomy Professor at UCL, while he successfully completed Part 1 of the Fellowship of the Royal College of Surgeons (FRCS), London qualification. From 1970 until 1976 he did his surgical residency at Peter Bent Brigham Hospital, Children's Hospital; the Joslin Clinic, Harvard Medical School; and at Boston University Hospital, Boston, Massachusetts. It was at Boston University Hospital (now Boston Medical Center) that he began his surgical career in surgical oncology and clinical nutrition, as assistant professor. Concomitantly, from 1978 until 1982 he was a graduate student in the department of human nutrition at Massachusetts Institute of Technology (MIT), earning a PhD in nutritional biochemistry.

Over the next five years (1979–1984) he was associate surgeon at City of Hope National Medical Center, Duarte, California; UCLA Medical School; and the West Los Angeles VA Medical Center. He was founder and director of the department of nutrition, in the division of surgery, at the City of Hope National Medical Center. From there he was recruited to a tenured professor position at the Upstate Medical University's department of surgery, and the Syracuse VA Hospital in New York. He was professor of surgery; vice-chair for surgical research; and director of the surgical metabolism and nutrition laboratory in the Neuroscience-Physiology Graduate Program (NIH and NGO funded continuously from 1983 through 2011), where he trained 47 graduate students and fellows, as well as 6 PhD defenses; and director of nutritional support services at both hospitals. He was also the director of the Institutional Review Board at Syracuse VA Medical Center. He started in 1983 Nutrition: The International Journal of Applied and Basic Nutritional Sciences. He co-founded the Breast Surgery Program at Upstate Medical University.

== Recognition ==
- Elected Fellow, International Behavioral Neuroscience Society (1997)
- Recipient of American Medical Association, Joseph B. Goldberger Award in Clinical Nutrition (1997)
- Editor – Section in Catabolism: Current Opinions in Clinical Nutrition and Metabolic Care (2001–2010)
- Ethan Sims Young Investigators Award Finalist, Annual NAASO-The Obesity Society Conference, Las Vegas, NV (2004)
- Life Member, The Fellows Leadership Society, American College of Surgeons Foundation (2006)
- Elected Fellow, European Society for Clinical Nutrition and Metabolism (ESPEN) (2010)

== Nutrition scientific misconduct case ==
In 2005, Meguid, as editor-in-chief of Nutrition, retracted a paper by Ranjit Kumar Chandra titled "Effect of vitamin and trace-element supplementation on cognitive function in elderly subjects". Chandra filed suit, and a decade of discussion about scientific misconduct followed, with the Chandra case being mentioned in more than 90 articles. In 2015 Chandra was found guilty of misconduct. The Lancet then retracted the study they had published in 1992.

In 2015, the case was finally brought to a close in Meguid's favor, and made public in the October 2015 British Medical Journal article "Ranjit Chandra: how reputation bamboozled the scientific community." In January 2016, The Lancet published a retraction of the paper, "Effect of vitamin and trace-element supplementation on immune responses and infection in elderly subjects," that Meguid had originally questioned.

== Literary publications ==
- "The Interview". The Bennington Review: 99–104. June 2012.
- "My First Appendectomy". The Journal of Arts, Literature, and Social Commentary (6): 323–337.
- "The LeRoy catastrophe: A story of death, determination, and the importance of nutrition in medicine". Columbia Medical Review. 2015.
- "The Colors of Pride". Hektoen International Journal of Medical Humanities. 2016. OCLC 621429987.
- "The Assignment". Marco Island Writers Anthology. Vol. III. 2016. pp. 168–176.
- "It Takes a Team". Hektoen International Journal of Medical Humanities. 2016. OCLC 621429987.
- "Malnourished Patients Fall Through the Cracks in America's Hospitals". Malnutrition Deeply. April 4, 2018.
