= Wahid Abdel Meguid =

Egyptian political analyst and previous MP

Wahid Abdel Meguid is an Egyptian thinker and political analyst. He was born on 1955 in Shsrkia province (67 years ). He is a previous MP, and also previous official spokesperson for the Constituent Assembly of Egypt.

== Life ==
In the 1990s Abdel Meguid edited the Arab Strategic Report for the Al-Ahram Center for Political and Strategic Studies.

Abdel Meguid headed the coordinating committee of the FJP-led Democratic Alliance for Egypt at the end of 2011, and became a member of the People's Assembly of Egypt in the 2011-2012 parliamentary elections. He was reportedly on the party list for the FJP for the Qasr al-Nil district of Cairo, though he has also sometimes been characterized as an independent MP.

In March 2012 he became one of the 50 parliamentarians elected to the Constituent Assembly of Egypt. He was a member of the mediation committee which worked to end the political stalemate over the assembly's composition. Initially declaring that the committee had agreed parliamentarians would not sit on the Constituent Assembly, he later reversed this statement. He kept his own place in the Constituent Assembly when it was revamped in June 2012, and since July 2012 he has been the Constituent Assembly's official spokesperson.

== Works ==
- (with others) The Gulf Crisis: Dimensions and Possibilities, Middle East Papers (Published by National Centre for Middle East Studies, Cairo), Special Dossier, November 1990
- (ed. with Ola A. Abou Zeid) Islamic movements in a changing world, Cairo: Center for Political Research & Studies; Bonn: Friedrich Ebert Stiftung, 1995.
- (ed.) Al-Takrir al-Estratigi al-Arabi [Arab Strategic Report] 1997, Cairo: Al-Ahram Center for Political and Strategic Studies, 1998. (Arabic)
- (ed.) Al-Takrir al-Estratigi al-Arabi [Arab Strategic Report] 1998, Cairo: Al-Ahram Center for Political and Strategic Studies, 1999. (Arabic)
- L'attitude arabe face à la violence, trans. by Fouad Nohra, 2008.
