= Clinical nutrition =

Medical speciality

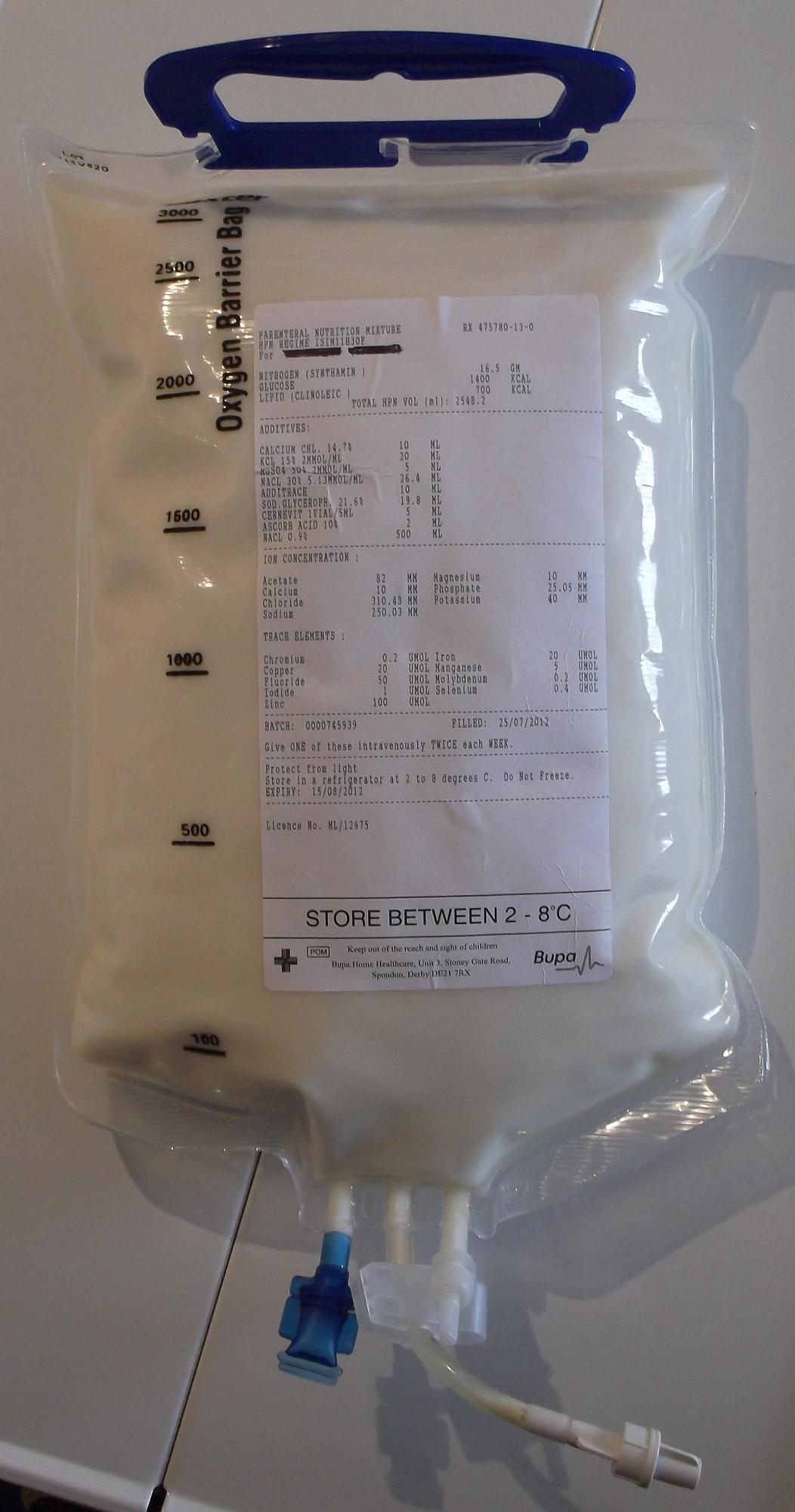
A bag of prescription lipid parenteral nutrition formulation, which can be used for clinical nutrition purposes

Clinical nutrition centers on the prevention, diagnosis, and management of nutritional changes in patients linked to chronic diseases and conditions primarily in health care. Clinical in this sense refers to the management of patients, including not only outpatients at clinics and in private practice, but also inpatients in hospitals. It incorporates primarily the scientific fields of nutrition and dietetics. Furthermore, clinical nutrition aims to maintain a healthy energy balance, while also providing sufficient amounts of nutrients such as protein, vitamins, and minerals to patients.

== Dietary needs and disease processes ==
Normally, individuals obtain the necessary nutrients their bodies require through normal daily diets that process the foods accordingly within the body. Nevertheless, there are circumstances such as disease, distress, stress, and so on that may prevent the body from obtaining sufficient nutrients through diets alone. In such conditions, a dietary supplementation specifically formulated for their individual condition may be required to fill the void created by the specific condition. This can come in the form of Medical Nutrition.

== Methods of nutrition ==
Among the routes of administration, the preferred means of nutrition is, if possible, oral administration. Alternatives include enteral administration (in nasogastric feeding) and intravenous (in parenteral nutrition).

== Clinical malnutrition ==
In the field of clinical nutrition, malnutrition has causes, epidemiology and management distinct from those associated with malnutrition that is mainly related to poverty.

The main causes of clinical malnutrition are:

- Cachexia caused by diseases, injuries and/or aging
- Difficulties with ingestion, such as stroke, paresis, dementia, depression, dysphagia

Clinical malnutrition may also be aggravated by iatrogenic factors, i.e., the inability of a health care entity to appropriately compensate for causes of malnutrition.

There are various definitions of clinical malnutrition. According to one of them, patients are defined as severely undernourished when meeting at least one of the following criteria: BMI < or = 20 kg/m^{2} and/or > or = 5% unintentional weight loss in the past month and/or > or = 10% unintentional weight loss in the past 6 months. By the same system, the patient is moderately undernourished if they met at least one of the following criteria: BMI 20.1–22 kg/m^{2} and/or 5-10% unintentional weight loss in the past six months.

== Nutritional therapy ==
Nutritional therapy is the use of specific nutrition services to treat an illness, injury, or condition. It was introduced in 1994 by the American Dietetic Association to better articulate the nutrition therapy process. It involves the assessment of the nutritional status of the client and the actual treatment, which includes nutrition therapy, counseling, and the use of specialized nutrition supplements, devised and monitored by a medical doctor physician or registered dietitian nutritionist. Registered dietitians started using nutritional therapy as a dietary intervention for preventing or treating other health conditions that are caused by or made worse by unhealthy eating habits.

The goal of medical nutritional therapy is to reduce the risk of developing complications in pre-existing conditions, such as type 2 diabetes and high blood cholesterol. Many medical conditions either develop or are made worse by an improper or unhealthy diet. Diabetes self-management training is an education and training program by a healthcare professional rather than a personal treatment plan from a registered dietitian.

=== Administration ===
In most cases, the use of medical nutrition therapy is recommended within international and professional guidelines. It can be an integral part of managing acute and short-term diseases. It can also play a major role in supporting people for extended periods of time and even for a lifetime in some special cases. Medical nutrition therapy is not meant to replace the treatment of disease but rather complement the normal use of drug therapies prescribed by physicians and other licensed healthcare providers.

Unlike medical foods which are defined by the U.S. Department of Health and Human Services Food and Drug Administration, within their Medical Foods Guidance Documents & Regulatory Information guide in section 5(b) of the Orphan Drug Act (21 U.S.C. 30ee (b) (3)); as "a food which is formulated to be consumed or administered enterally under the supervision of a physician and which is intended for the specific dietary management of a disease or condition for which distinctive nutritional requirements, based on recognized scientific principles, are established by medical evaluation,"

=== Advantages ===
The following advantages come with medical nutrition:

- It may be effective in treating type 1 or type 2 diabetes.
- It may improve quality of life at any age

=== Disadvantages ===
The following are some disadvantages of medical nutrition:

- A person may need to follow a strict diet to see benefits while using a medical nutrition plan.
- Some forms of medical nutrition may be unaffordable.

== Journals ==
The American Journal of Clinical Nutrition is the highest-ranked journal in ISI's nutrition category.

== See also ==
- European Society for Clinical Nutrition and Metabolism
- Eating disorders
- Medical food
- Nutrition
- Therapeutic food
