= European Society for Clinical Nutrition and Metabolism =

The European Society for Clinical Nutrition and Metabolism (ESPEN) is an organization in the field of enteral and parenteral nutrition and promotes basic and clinical research, basic and advanced education, organization of consensus statements about clinical care and care quality control.

== History ==
In 1979, an informal meeting laid the foundations of ESPEN, deciding to create a multidisciplinary society devoted to the study of metabolic problems associated with acute diseases and their nutritional implications and management. ESPEN was formally established in 1980 as the European Society for Parenteral and Enteral Nutrition. It later changed its name to the European Society for Clinical Nutrition and Metabolism.

== Activities ==
Congress meetings are held every year in a different European city and gather over 3,000 participants from 82 different countries. A bimonthly journal named Clinical Nutrition, which goes along with Clinical Nutrition Supplements and an electronic journal e-SPEN are the society's official publications, published by Elsevier.

European Parenteral and Enteral National Societies support ESPEN in the form of block members, e.g. the British, German, French, and Austrian societies. Under the umbrella of ESPEN, many ongoing projects are supported by its members, such as NutritionDay, Home Artificial Nutrition, and Fight Against Malnutrition.

== See also ==
- National Board of Physician Nutrition Specialists
