= Muslim Association of Hawaii =

Islamic organization based in Hawaii, the United States

Religion
- Affiliation: Islam

Location
- Location: 1935 Aleo Pl, Honolulu, HI 96822

Architecture
- Minaret: 0

The Muslim Association of Hawaii is a nonprofit and charitable organization or a mosque in Manoa.

Ismail Elshikh is the imam of the association, and is from Cairo, Egypt.

Hakim Ouansafi, from Morocco, is the Arab head of the mosque committee, and is the president of the Muslim Association of Hawaii. Rashid Abdullah is the Information officer.

== History ==
The Muslim Students' Association of Hawaii was originally composed of students from the University of Hawaii at Manoa. They were members of the East West Center and came from various parts of the world: India, Pakistan, Afghanistan, Indonesia, Malaysia and from the Middle East. They prayed at a cottage in the East West center prior to the purchase of the Manoa building, which became the Muslim Association of Hawaii in 1990. It was the first organization to represent Hawaii's Muslim population. Mohammad Asad Khan was a founding member of the Muslim Students' Association.

In 1979, the MSA incorporated becoming the first official organization to represent Muslims in Hawaii. The group helped form the mosque, which is near the University of Hawaii. The majority of Muslim converts in Hawaii are military personnel.

== Financial support ==
In 2011, it was reported that the organization receives funds from Prince Abdulaziz Bin Fahad Al-Faisal of Saudi Arabia and that Ouansafi said, “foreign money ... come(s) with strings attached.”

== See also ==
- Islam Day in Hawaii
- Islam in Hawaii
