= Islam Day (Hawaii) =

- Star and crescent
- Significance: Arrival of Mohammad to Medina and recognition of Islam and Muslims.
- Celebrations: Fairs, Educational programs about Islam
- Date: September 24
- Next time: 24 September 2026
- Frequency: annual
- Related to: Hijra, Buddha Day, Confucius Day, Aloha Festivals, Makahiki

Islam Day was a day of recognition for Islam and Muslims in Hawaii on September 24, 2009, designated by a symbolic resolution of the State Legislature.

== Establishment ==
Hawaii House Concurrent Resolution 100 to establish the day was proposed by Lyla Berg and passed unanimously on May 6, 2009. The Hawaii Senate passed the resolution 22 to 3 to recognize "the rich religious, scientific, cultural and artistic contributions of the Islamic world". It was set for November 21 the founding of Islam, but moved to September 24 on the day Mohammad arrived in Medina in 644, allegedly because it conflicted with Aloha (Makahiki) Festivals. It was a state-designated day of recognition and not a holiday and no government funds were designated to it, to preserve the "separation of church and state". Muslims and supporters have seen it as an opportunity to repair the image of Islam, damaged by Islamic extremism. The public in Hawaii had a largely indifferent reaction to the news of the new day.

== First Celebration ==
On September 24, 2009, Hawaii celebrated its first Islam Day with events held at the University of Hawaii and around the islands. At Ala Moana Beach Park a festival was held by the Muslim Association of Hawaii with more than 1000 people attending. "We expected 200 to 300, so we're very pleased with the turnout." Twelve police and guards were present but no protest or disturbance took place.

== See also ==
- Islam Awareness Week
- Hijra
