= Lauren Bacall on screen and stage =

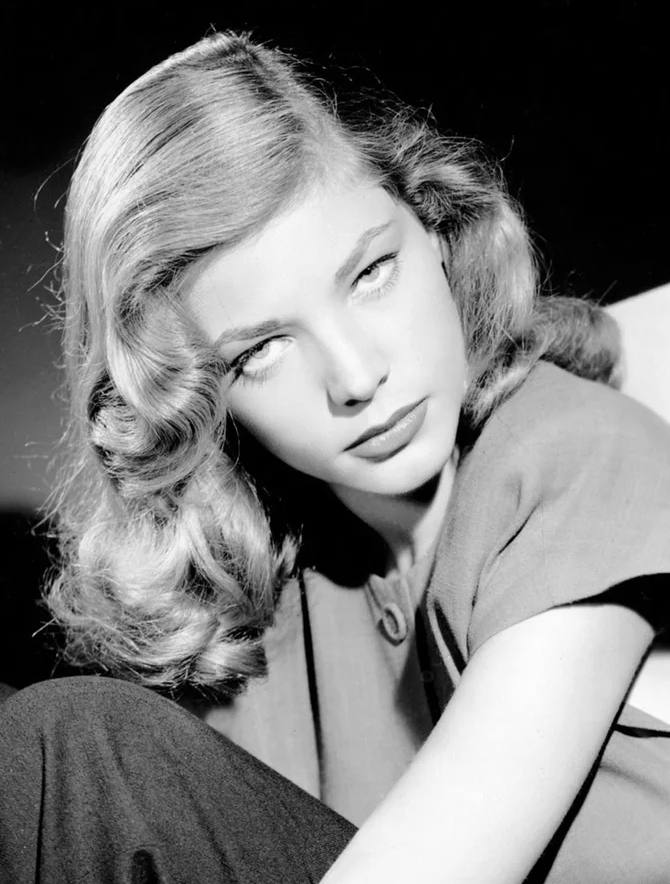
Publicity photo, March 1945

American actress Lauren Bacall (1924–2014) had an extensive career in films, television shows, and plays. She was one of the leading ladies during the Golden Age of Hollywood along with actresses such as Marilyn Monroe and Rita Hayworth. Bacall started her career as a teenage fashion model when she appeared on the cover of Harper's Bazaar and was discovered by Howard Hawks' wife Nancy. As she naturally had a high-pitched and nasal voice, she received lessons to help deepen it and was required to shout verses by Shakespeare for hours every day as part of her training.

Bacall's first film appearance was with Humphrey Bogart in the 1944 film To Have and Have Not. The following year she married Bogart and went on to appear with him in The Big Sleep (1946), Dark Passage (1947), and Key Largo (1948). She also starred in comedies such as How to Marry a Millionaire in 1953 with Marilyn Monroe, Designing Woman in 1957 with Gregory Peck, and Sex and the Single Girl in 1964 with Natalie Wood. Bacall also appeared in Murder on the Orient Express (1974) and The Shootist (1976).

In Bacall's later years, she appeared in the films All I Want for Christmas (1991), Prêt-à-Porter (1994), The Mirror Has Two Faces (1996), My Fellow Americans (1996), Diamonds (1999), Dogville (2003), Eve (2008) Wide Blue Yonder (2010) and The Forger (2012). For her role as Hannah Morgan in The Mirror Has Two Faces, Bacall won the Golden Globe Award for Best Supporting Actress – Motion Picture and was nominated for a BAFTA and an Academy Award. Her television work included appearances on Mr. Broadway (1964), Chicago Hope (1998), and The Rockford Files (1979), as well as providing the voice of Evelyn on the animated series Family Guy (2014).

Bacall also performed on Broadway in the plays Cactus Flower in 1965 and The Visit in 1995 and musicals such as Applause in 1970 and Woman of the Year in 1981. For her roles in Applause and Woman of the Year, she won the Tony Award for Best Actress in a Musical.

== Filmography ==
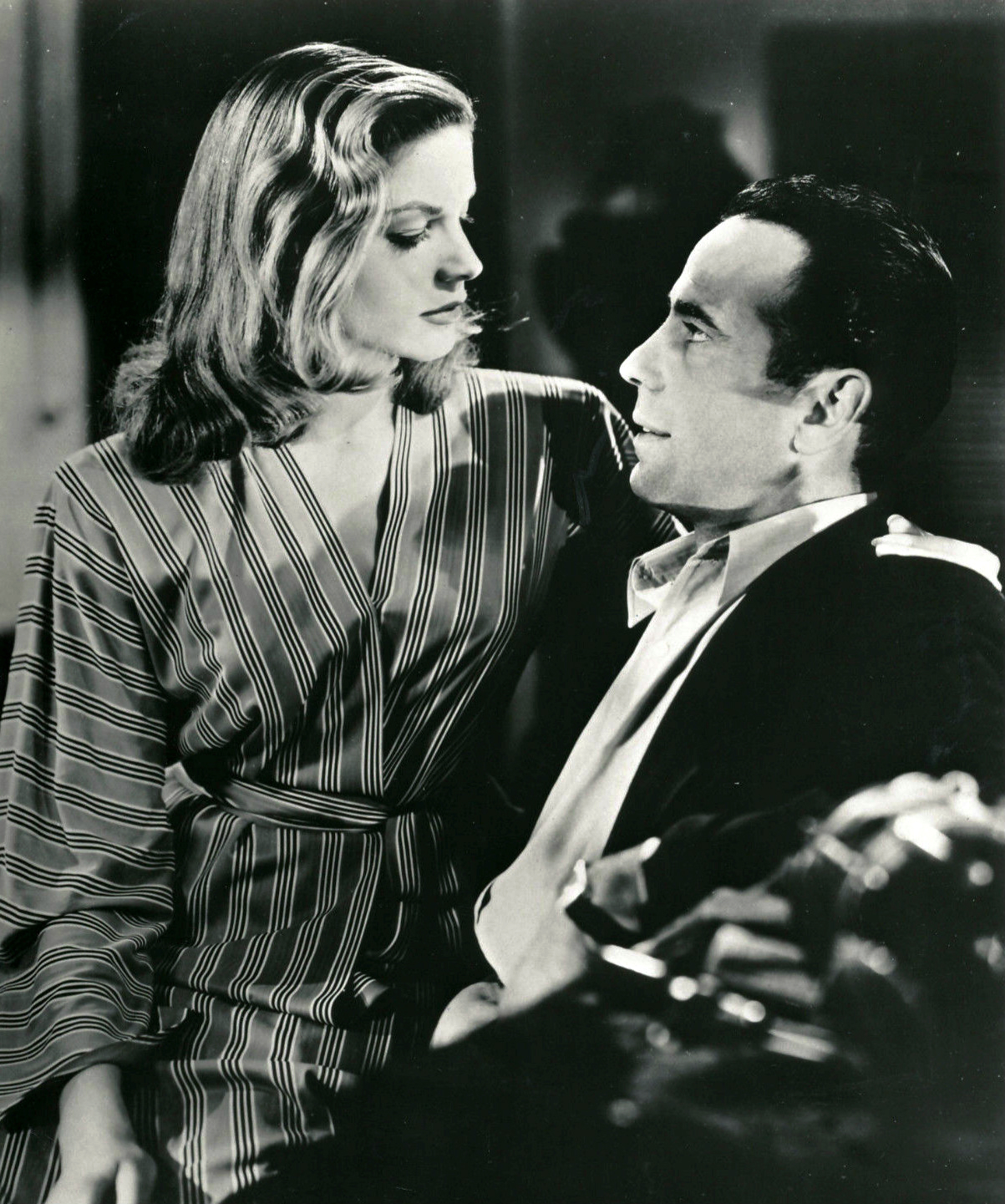
In To Have and Have Not with Humphrey Bogart (1944)

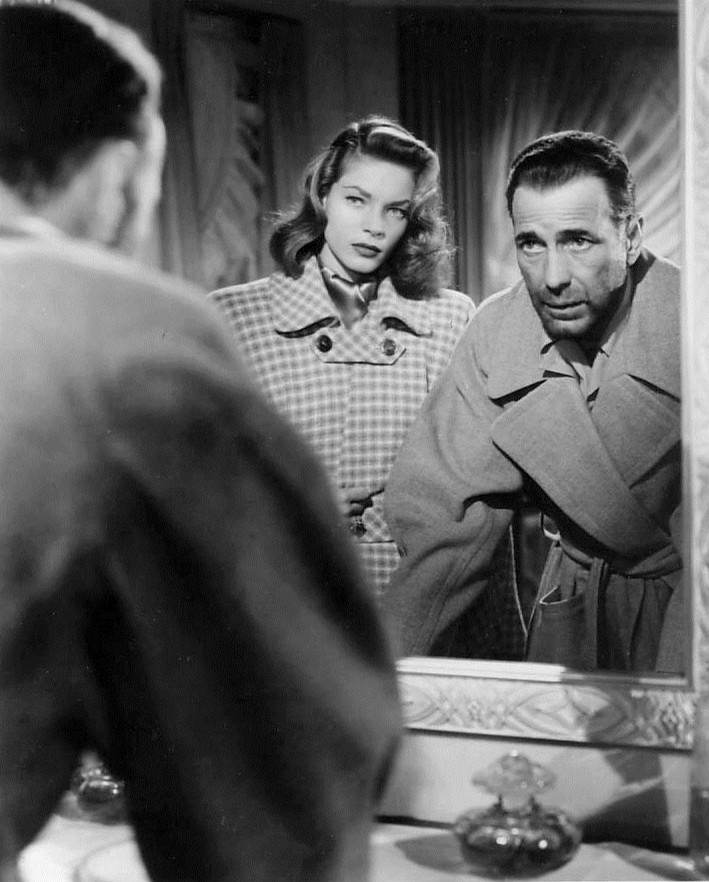
In Dark Passage with Humphrey Bogart (1947)

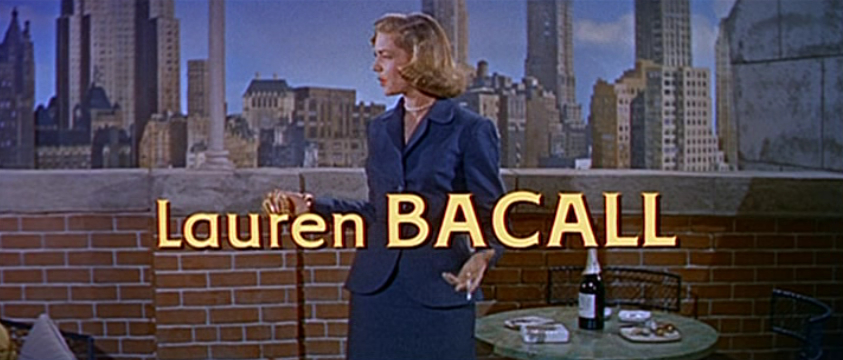
In How to Marry a Millionaire (1953)

Year	Title	Role	Notes	Ref.
1944	To Have and Have Not	Marie "Slim" Browning		
1945	Confidential Agent	Rose Cullen		
1946	Two Guys from Milwaukee	Herself (cameo)		
1946	The Big Sleep	Vivian Sternwood Rutledge		
1947	Dark Passage	Irene Jansen		
1948	Key Largo	Nora Temple		
1950	Young Man with a Horn	Amy North		
1950	Bright Leaf	Sonia Kovac		
1953	How to Marry a Millionaire	Schatze Page		
1954	Woman's World	Elizabeth Burns	Alternate title: A Woman's World	
1955	The Cobweb	Meg Faversen Rinehart		
1955	Blood Alley	Cathy Grainger		
1956	Written on the Wind	Lucy Moore Hadley		
1957	Designing Woman	Marilla Brown Hagen		
1958	The Gift of Love	Julie Beck		
1959	North West Frontier	Catherine Wyatt	Alternate title: Flame Over India	
1964	Shock Treatment	Dr. Edwina Beighley		
1964	Sex and the Single Girl	Sylvia Broderick		
1966	Harper	Elaine Sampson	Alternate title: The Moving Target	
1974	Murder on the Orient Express	Mrs. Harriet Belinda Hubbard		
1976	The Shootist	Bond Rogers		
1980	HealtH	Esther Brill		
1981	The Fan	Sally Ross		
1988	Appointment with Death	Lady Westholme		
1988	Mr. North	Amelia Cranston		
1988	John Huston: The Man, the Movies, the Maverick	Herself	Documentary film	
1989	Tree of Hands	Marsha Archdale	Alternate title: Innocent Victim	
1990	Misery	Marcia Sindell		
1991	A Star for Two	Edwige		
1991	All I Want for Christmas	Lillian Brooks		
1994	Ready to Wear (Prêt-à-Porter)	Slim Chrysler		
1996	The Mirror Has Two Faces	Hannah Morgan		
1996	My Fellow Americans	Margaret Kramer		
1997	Day and Night	Sonia	French title: Le Jour et la Nuit	
1999	Get Bruce	Herself	Documentary film	
1999	Madeline: Lost in Paris	Madame Lacroque (voice)	Animated film	
1999	Diamonds	Sin-Dee		
1999	Presence of Mind	Mado Remei		
1999	The Venice Project	Countess Camilla Volta		
1999	A Conversation with Gregory Peck	Herself	Documentary film	
2003	Dogville	Ma Ginger		
2003	Gone Dark	May Markham	Alternate title: The Limit	
2004	Howl's Moving Castle	Witch of the Waste (voice)	Animated film	
2004	Birth	Eleanor		
2004	Amália Traïda	TV Announcer	Short film	
2005	Manderlay	Mam		
2006	These Foolish Things	Dame Lydia		
2007	The Walker	Natalie Van Miter		
2008	Eve	Grandma	Short film	
2008	Scooby-Doo! and the Goblin King	The Grand Witch (voice)	Animated film	
2010	Wide Blue Yonder	May	Alternate title: All at Sea	
2011	The Forger	Anne-Marie Cole	Alternate title: Carmel-by-the-Sea (final film role)	
2012	Ernest & Celestine	The Grey One (voice)	Animated film (final animated film role)	

== Television ==
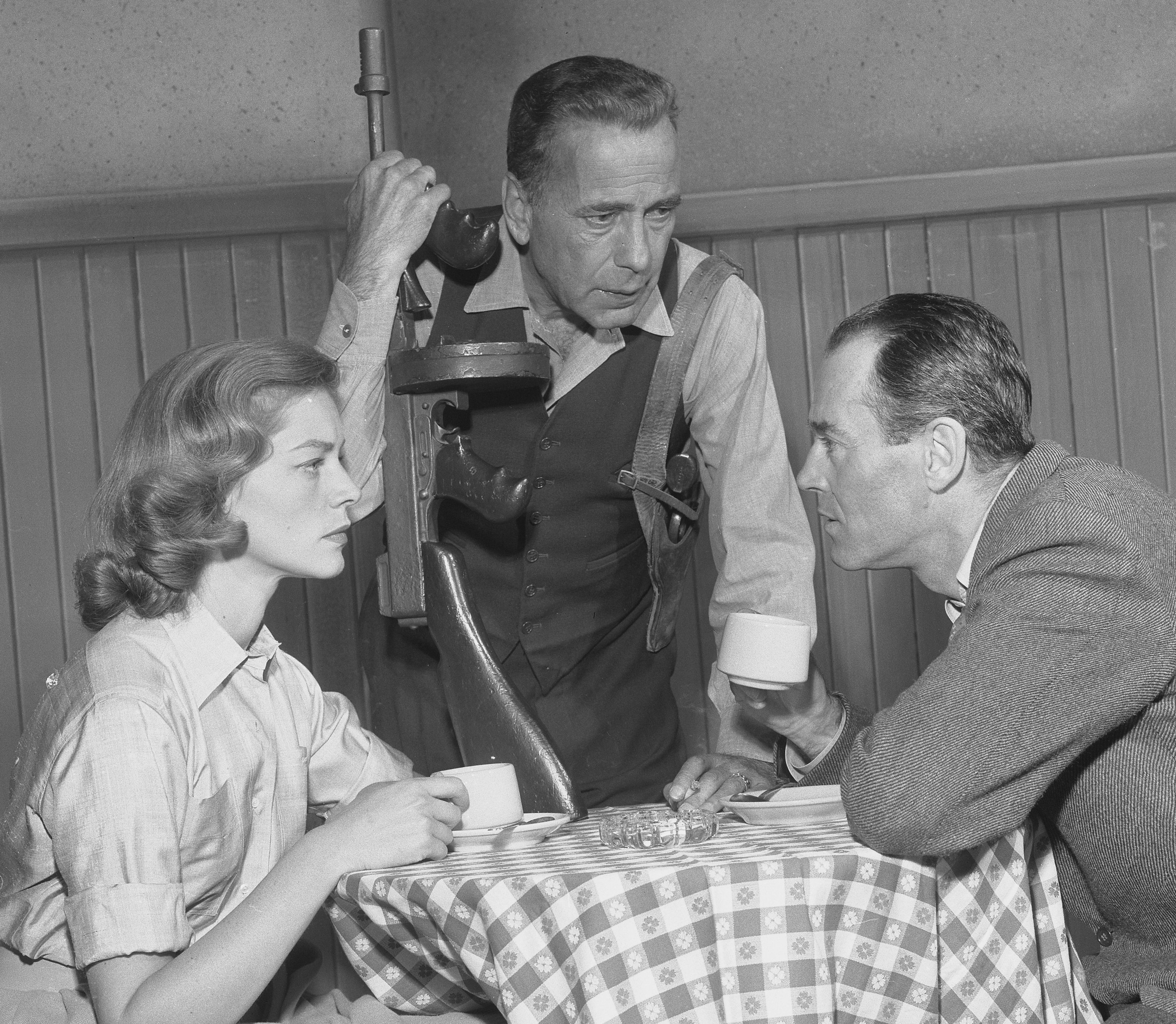
With Humphrey Bogart (middle) and Henry Fonda in the TV broadcast play "The Petrified Forest", (1956)

Year	Title	Role	Notes	Ref.
1953	What's My Line?	Herself – Mystery Guest	2 episodes	
1954	Light's Diamond Jubilee	Herself – Guest Star	Television special	
1955	Producers' Showcase	Gabby Maple	Episode: "The Petrified Forest"	
1956	Ford Star Jubilee	Elvira Condomine	Episode: "Blithe Spirit"	
1963	The DuPont Show of the Week	Lorraine Boswell	Episode: "A Dozen Deadly Roses"	
1963	Dr. Kildare	Virginia Herson	Episode: "The Oracle"	
1964	Mr. Broadway	Barbara Lake	Episodes: "Take a Walk Through a Cemetery", "Something to Sing About"	
1965	Bob Hope Presents the Chrysler Theatre	Amanda / Barbara	Episode: "Double Jeopardy"	
1973	Applause	Margo Channing	Television special (videotaped stage performance)	
1975	Happy Endings	Catharine	Television special (segment: "A Commercial Break")	
1978	Perfect Gentlemen	Lizzie Martin	Television film	
1979	The Rockford Files	Kendall Warren	Episodes: "Lions, Tigers, Monkeys and Dogs: Part 1 & 2"	
1989	Dinner at Eight	Carlotta Vance	Television film	
1990	A Little Piece of Sunshine	Beatrix Coltrane	Television film	
1991	HBO Storybook Musicals	Freezelda (voice)	Episode: "The Ice Queen's Mittens"	
1993	The Portrait	Fanny Church	Television film	
1993	General Motors Playwrights Theater	Herself – Host	10 episodes	
1993	A Foreign Field	Lisa	Television film	
1993	Great Performances	Narrator (voice)	Episode: "Leonard Bernstein: The Gift of Music"	
1995	From the Mixed-Up Files of Mrs. Basil E. Frankweiler	Mrs. Basil E. Frankweiler	Television film	
1998	Chicago Hope	Samara Visco Klein	Episodes: "Risky Business", "Absent Without Leave"	
1999	Too Rich: The Secret Life of Doris Duke	Doris Duke	Television miniseries	
2006	The Sopranos	Herself – Guest Star	Episode: "Luxury Lounge"	
2008	Empire State Building Murders	Penny Baxter	Television film	
2014	Family Guy	Evelyn (voice)	Episode: "Mom's the Word" (final television role)	

== Theatre ==
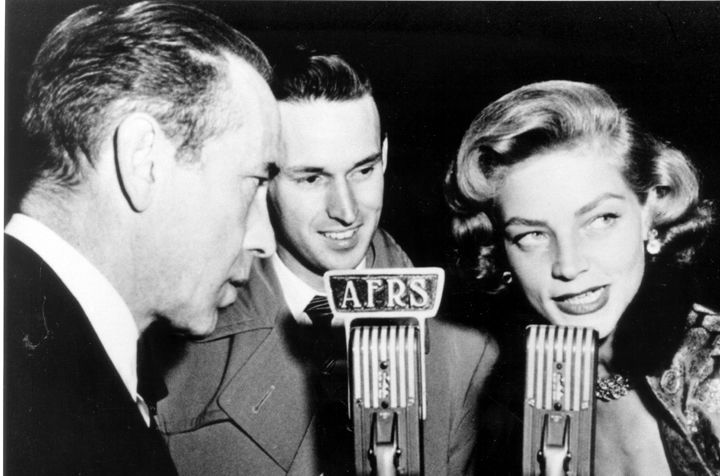
With Humphrey Bogart (left) and AFRS Broadcaster Jack Brown during a broadcast to troops overseas during World War II.

Year	Title	Role	Notes	Ref.
1942	Johnny 2x4	Ensemble	Broadway (credited as Betty Bacall)	
1942	Franklin Street	Unnamed teenager		
1959	Goodbye Charlie	Charlie	Broadway	
1965	Cactus Flower	Stephanie	Broadway	
1970	Applause	Margo Channing	Broadway and West End	
1977	Wonderful Town	Ruth Sherwood	Summer stock	
1979	V.I.P. Night on Broadway	Herself	Broadway (benefit concert)	
1981	Woman of the Year	Tess Harding	Broadway	
1985	Sweet Bird of Youth	The Princess Kosmonopolis	West End	
1989	The Players Club Centennial Salute	Herself	Broadway (benefit concert)	
1995	The Visit	Claire Zachanassian	Chichester Festival	
1996	Angela Lansbury: A Celebration	Herself	Broadway (benefit concert)	
1999	Waiting in the Wings	Lotta Bainbridge	Broadway	

== Radio ==
- Lux Radio Theatre (1946) - Episode: To Have and Have Not
- Bold Venture (1951–1952) - 78 episodes

== See also ==
- List of awards and nominations received by Lauren Bacall
- Humphrey Bogart on stage, screen, radio and television
