= San Diego Film Critics Society Awards 1996 =

Critics film awards held in San Diego

1st SDFCS Awards

December 28, 1996

Best Film:
Fargo

The 1st San Diego Film Critics Society Awards, given by the San Diego Film Critics Society on 28 December 1996, honored the best in film for 1996.

== Winners ==
- Best Actor:
  - Kenneth Branagh – Hamlet
- Best Actress:
  - Frances McDormand – Fargo
- Best Director:
  - Joel Coen – Fargo
- Best Film:
  - Fargo
- Best Foreign Language Film:
  - Ridicule (French)
- Best Supporting Actor:
  - Armin Mueller-Stahl – Shine
- Best Supporting Actress:
  - Lauren Bacall – The Mirror Has Two Faces
