= Wide Blue Yonder (film) =

2010 Norwegian-British black comedy-drama film

- Film poster
- Directed by: Robert Young
- Written by: Hugh Janes
- Based on: Two of a Kind, a 1995 play by Hugh Janes
- Produced by: John Cairns; Stephen Cranny; Robert Young
- Starring: Brian Cox; Lauren Bacall; James Fox
- Cinematography: Svein Krøvel
- Edited by: Jeremy Strachan
- Music by: Bill Connor
- Production companies: Euromax Productions; Wide Blue Films
- Distributed by: Europafilm
- Release dates: 19 August 2010 (Norwegian International Film Festival); 25 May 2012 (Norway)
- Running time: 89 minutes
- Countries: Norway; United Kingdom
- Language: English
- Budget: 8.7 million (USD) €6.4 million (Euro)

Wide Blue Yonder (Norwegian: Wide Blue Yonder - Begravelse til besvær, also released as All at Sea) is a 2010 Norwegian-British black comedy-drama film about an old rogue sailor who breaks all the rules to fulfill an old friend's dying wish to be buried at sea. The film was directed by Robert Young from a screenplay written by Hugh Janes, adapted from his stage play Two of a Kind (1995). It stars Brian Cox, Lauren Bacall and James Fox.

== Plot ==
Two retired sailors, Wally and Skipper, are old workmates and best friends for 40 years now living at an old folks’ home in Norway. One day, Wally finds Skipper dead and he wants a burial at sea, the old-fashioned way, as he promised him. Wally isn't going to let the fact that he doesn't have a boat, any money or, for that matter, a body, stop him from keeping his word. He takes his friends May, George and Nina on a bold mission to send the coffin to the bottom of the North Sea. Ms. Reimark, the administrator of the local retirement community where Wally lives, has other plans for him and the deceased.

== Cast ==
- Brian Cox as Wally
- Lauren Bacall as May
- James Fox as George
- Hege Schøyen as Ms. Reimark
- Ingrid Bolsø Berdal as Nina

== Production ==
Wide Blue Yonder was originally written for the theatre by British playwright Hugh Janes and staged in London's West End with Eric Sykes as the lead.

=== Filming ===
The film was shot on locations in Haugesund Municipality, Karmøy Municipality, and Sveio Municipality from 13 July to mid-August 2007.

Problems with the film began during principal photography when British producer John Cairns' Parkland Films and Norwegian producer Bjørg Veland's Euromax Productions were unable to pay their bills, including salary for cast and crew. They had raised only €2.4 million of the production's €6.4 million budget.

Norwegian producer Bjarne Hareide was brought in to restructure the financing, but when filming wrapped, €1.6 million local costs were still uncovered. New investments were needed to finish the feature and the film was finally ready for a star-studded world premiere at the Norwegian International Film Festival in 2010. However, it took another two years to clarify the rights, further complicated by the British producer's bankruptcy.

=== Release ===
Wide Blue Yonder world premiered at the Norwegian International Film Festival in Haugesund on 19 August 2010 and was also screened at the 2011 Cannes Film Festival in May 2011. Five years after its completed production, it was finally released in Norway on 25 May 2012 and saw a limited release in the United States on 27 June 2014.
