= Dinner at Eight (1933 film) =

1933 film

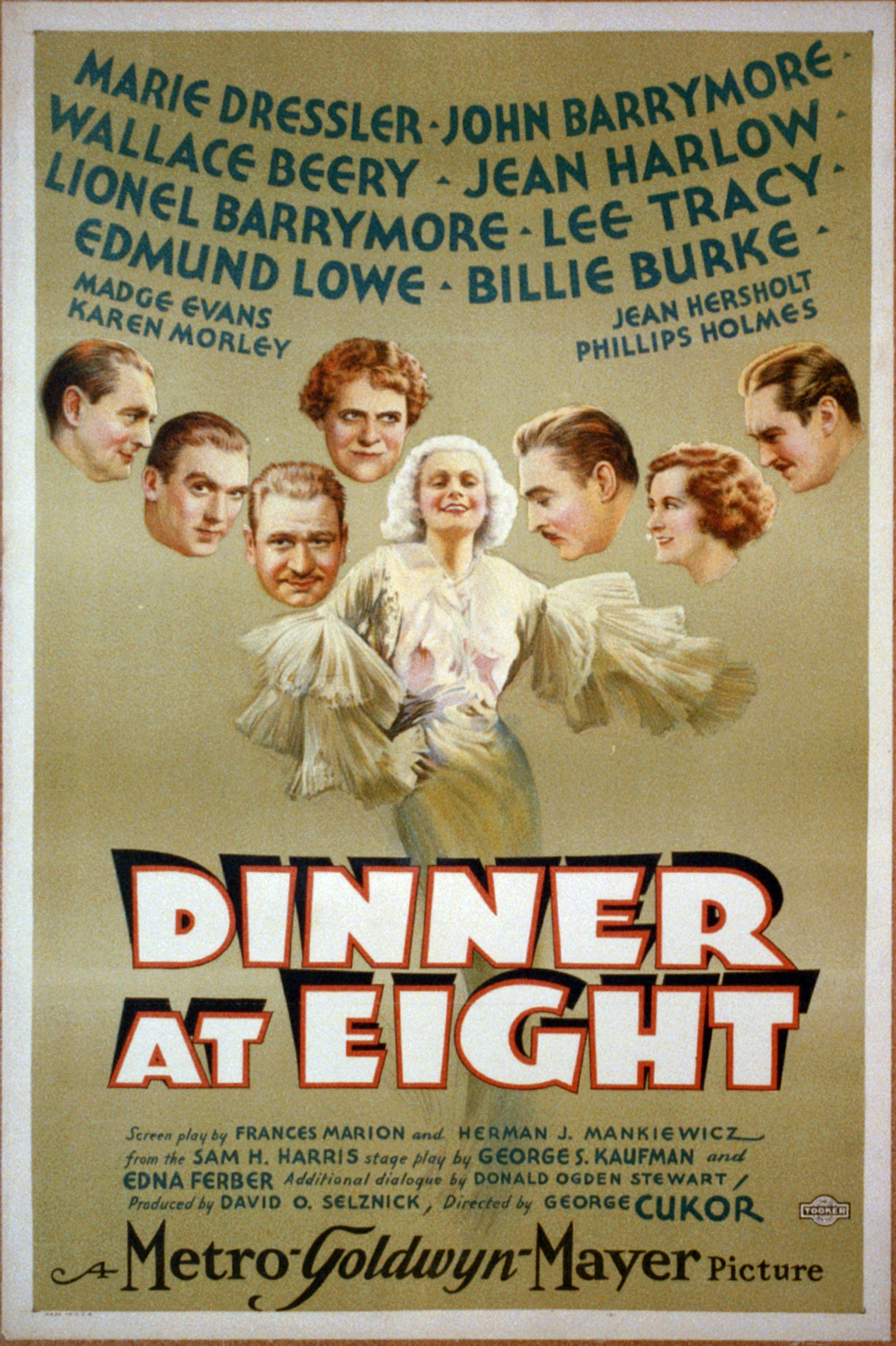
- Theatrical release poster
- Directed by: George Cukor
- Screenplay by: Frances Marion; Herman J. Mankiewicz
- Additional dialogue by: Donald Ogden Stewart
- Based on: Dinner at Eight; 1932 play by George S. Kaufman; Edna Ferber
- Produced by: David O. Selznick
- Starring: Marie Dressler; John Barrymore; Wallace Beery; Jean Harlow; Lionel Barrymore; Lee Tracy; Edmund Lowe; Billie Burke
- Cinematography: William H. Daniels
- Edited by: Ben Lewis
- Music by: William Axt
- Production company: Metro-Goldwyn-Mayer
- Distributed by: Loew's Inc.
- Release date: August 29, 1933
- Running time: 113 minutes 111 minutes (Turner library print)
- Country: United States
- Language: English
- Budget: $435,000
- Box office: $2,156,000 (worldwide rentals)

Dinner at Eight is a 1933 American pre-Code comedy-drama film directed by George Cukor from a screenplay by Frances Marion and Herman J. Mankiewicz, based on George S. Kaufman and Edna Ferber's 1932 play of the same title. The film features an ensemble cast of Marie Dressler, John Barrymore, Wallace Beery, Jean Harlow, Lionel Barrymore, Lee Tracy, Edmund Lowe, and Billie Burke.

Dinner at Eight continues to be acclaimed by critics; review aggregator Rotten Tomatoes reports an approval rating of 91% based on 22 reviews. In 2023, the film was selected for preservation in the United States National Film Registry by the Library of Congress as being "culturally, historically or aesthetically significant".

== Plot ==
New York City society matron Millicent Jordan is overjoyed when she receives word that Lord and Lady Ferncliffe, the richest couple in England, have accepted her invitation to her upcoming dinner party. However, her husband Oliver, a shipping magnate, finds Lord Ferncliffe a bore. Their daughter, Paula, is preoccupied with the impending return of her fiancé, Ernest DeGraff, from Europe.

Oliver asks Millicent to invite legendary stage actress Carlotta Vance, who has just arrived from Europe. A former lover of Oliver's, Carlotta confesses to him that she is nearly penniless and is interested in selling her stock in the Jordan Shipping Line, but he lacks the funds, as his business has been severely affected by the Great Depression.

Nouveau riche magnate Dan Packard, a former miner, agrees to consider helping Oliver, but later brags to his young, gold-digger wife, Kitty, that he plans to take over the Jordan Shipping Line through crooked stock purchases. Oliver convinces Millicent to invite the Packards. While Kitty eagerly accepts the invitation, Dan refuses to go, but changes his mind when he learns that Lord Ferncliffe will be in attendance.

On the morning of her dinner, Millicent loses the "extra man" she found for Carlotta. She telephones Larry Renault, a washed-up silent film star, and extends a last-minute invitation, unaware that Paula is in his hotel room. Larry and Paula have been having an affair for a month, but he wants to end it, citing their age difference (he is 47 and she is 19) and the fact that he is a three-time divorcé. Paula insists that she loves him, planning to tell her family and Ernest about their affair. Carlotta, who is staying in the same hotel, sees Paula leave Larry's room. Larry, a hardened alcoholic, is on the brink of physical and economic collapse. His agent, Max Kane, tells him that the stage play he was set to star in has a new producer, Jo Stengel. Stengel decided to cast another actor in the lead role, but is willing to consider Larry in a bit part.

The Jordans' physician and friend Dr. Wayne Talbot has been having an affair with Kitty on the pretext of tending to her feigned illnesses. On the day of the dinner, his wife, Lucy, catches him in a compromising telephone call with Kitty. Talbot admits that he is a serial adulterer and vows to overcome his impulses. Lucy is surprisingly understanding, and the two kiss. Talbot receives a visit from an ailing Oliver, who he discovers has terminal thrombosis of the coronary arteries. At home, Oliver tries to tell Millicent that he needs to rest, but she is too hysterical to pay attention to him because, among several domestic disasters, the Ferncliffes have canceled.

During a vicious fight, Kitty spitefully reveals to Dan that she is having an affair. When threatened with divorce, she demands that he back down from his takeover of the Jordan Line and treat her with more respect, or else she will sabotage his potential Cabinet appointment by exposing his crooked deals. Defeated, Dan storms off.

Before he leaves for the dinner, Larry is visited by Max and Stengel, who indicates that Larry is not necessarily being offered even the minor role Max mentioned. Drunk, Larry insults Stengel, who leaves. Max forces Larry to face reality: He has no future in show business. Max leaves and the hotel manager appears, to tell Larry he has until noon the next day to check out. In utter despair, Larry commits suicide by turning on his gas fireplace, vainly posing himself in the chair in which he is to be found.

The dinner guests arrive at the Jordans' mansion. Carlotta informs Paula that Larry has killed himself, consoling the young woman as she breaks down in tears. Millicent learns about Oliver's health and financial setbacks. Realizing her own selfishness, Millicent tells Oliver that she will change their lifestyle and be happier than ever. As the guests are about to go in to dinner, Kitty forces Dan to tell Oliver that he has saved the Jordan Line.

Carlotta and Kitty bring up the rear. Kitty tells Carlotta that she is reading a “nutty” book about how machinery will take over every profession. “…Oh my dear,” Carlotta replies, “that's something you need never worry about!”

== Cast ==
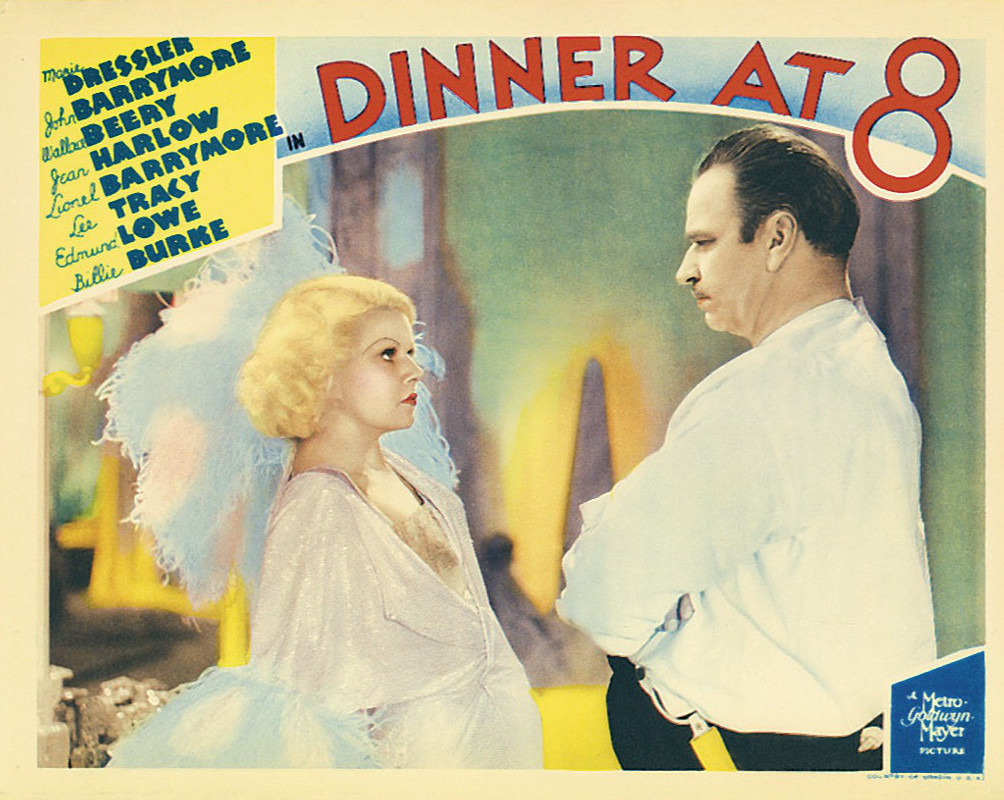
Lobby card

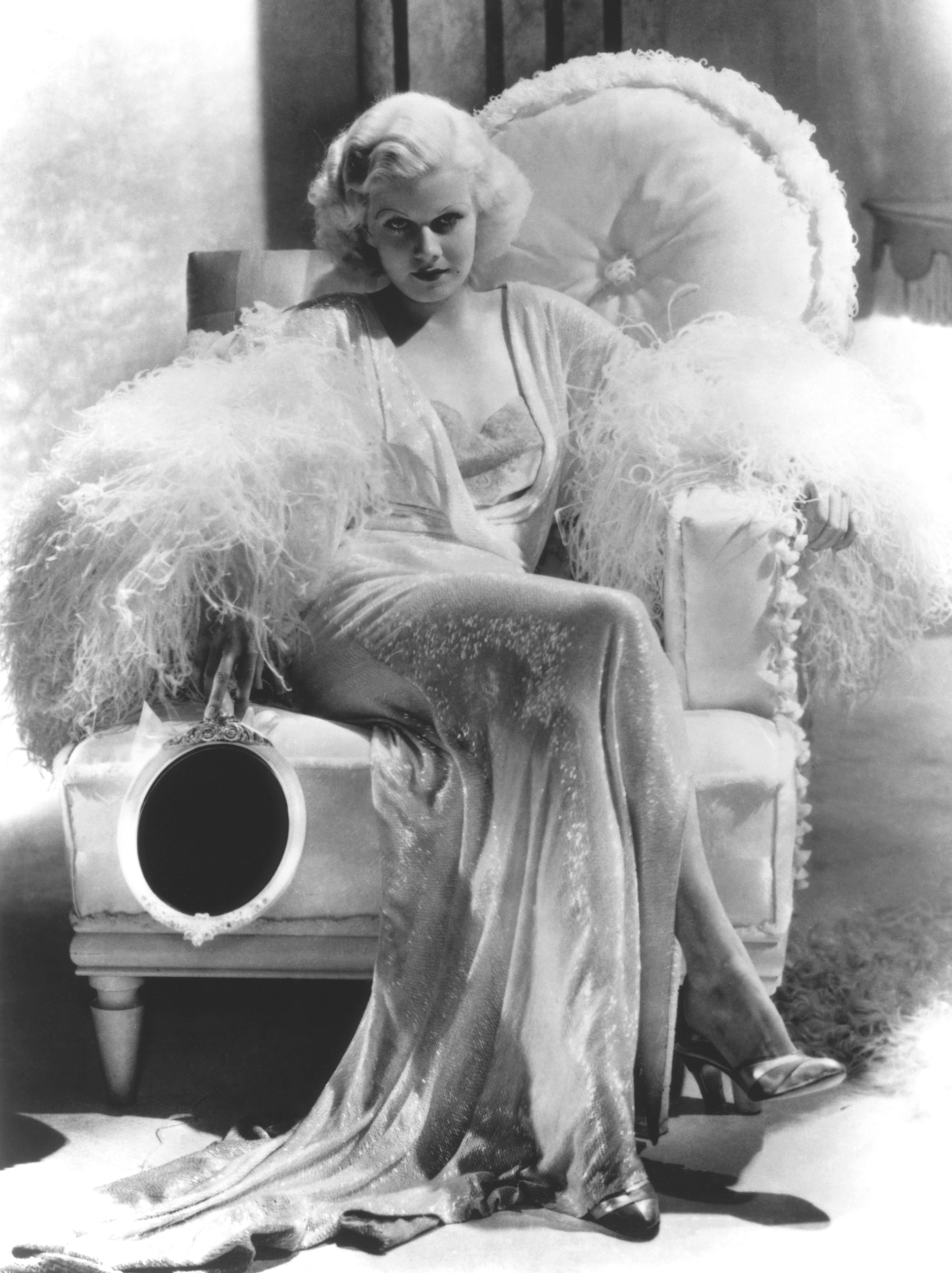
Jean Harlow as Kitty Packard in Dinner at Eight

- Marie Dressler as Carlotta Vance
- John Barrymore as Larry Renault
- Wallace Beery as Dan Packard
- Jean Harlow as Kitty Packard, Dan's wife
- Lionel Barrymore as Oliver Jordan
- Billie Burke as Millicent Jordan, Oliver's wife
- Lee Tracy as Max Kane, Larry Renault's agent
- Edmund Lowe as Dr. Wayne Talbot
- Madge Evans as Paula Jordan, the Jordans' daughter
- Jean Hersholt as Jo Stengel, a theatrical producer
- Karen Morley as Lucy Talbot, Wayne Talbot's wife
- Louise Closser Hale, as Hattie Loomis, Millie's cousin
- Phillips Holmes as Ernest DeGraff, Paula Jordan's fiancé
- May Robson as Mrs. Wendel, the Jordans' cook

The cast also includes

- Grant Mitchell, as Ed Loomis, Hattie's husband
- Phoebe Foster as Miss Alden
- Elizabeth Patterson as Miss Copeland
- Hilda Vaughn as Tina, Kitty's maid
- Harry Beresford as Fosdick
- Edwin Maxwell as Mr. Fitch, hotel manager
- John Davidson as Mr. Hatfield
- Edward Woods as Eddie
- Anna Duncan as Dora
- Herman Bing as the waiter

== Production ==
TCM.com says that the character of Carlotta was inspired by the popular stage and silent film actress Maxine Elliott, citing the March 13, 1940, obituary in The New York Times.

Marie Dressler died of cancer in July 1934, less than a year after Dinner at Eight was released. She was recovering from surgery when Dinner at Eight began filming.

Joan Crawford was considered for the part of Paula Jordan. Clark Gable was considered for the part of Dr. Wayne Talbot.

The name of Carlotta Vance's dog, Tarzan, was changed from Mussolini by MGM executives afraid of offending the Italian leader.

According to director George Cukor, John Barrymore created the character Larry Renault using memories of his father-in-law, Maurice Costello, his brother-in-law, Lowell Sherman, and himself.

== Reception ==
Dinner at Eight proved to be popular at the box office. According to MGM records the film earned $1,398,000 in the US and Canada and $758,000 elsewhere, resulting in a profit of $998,000.

In 1933, Dinner at Eight received very high marks from many leading reviewers. Mordaunt Hall, the widely read critic for The New York Times, admired the screenplay's thoughtful but "fast-moving" blend of drama and "flip dialogue", crediting the skillful adaptation of George S. Kaufman and Edna Ferber's script from the stage production, which had opened on Broadway the previous year. Hall also praised the performances of the film's star-studded cast, drawing special attention to the work of Marie Dressler, Billie Burke, John Barrymore, Wallace Beery, and Jean Harlow:

This Dinner at Eight has a cast of twenty-five, and among the players are most of the stellar lights of the Metro-Goldwyn-Mayer studios, besides a few borrowed from other companies. It is one of those rare pictures which keeps you in your seat until the final fade-out, for nobody wants to miss one of the scintillating lines.

It is a fast-moving narrative with its humor and tragedy, one that offers a greater variety of characterizations than have been witnessed in any other picture...A strong line of drama courses through the story notwithstanding the flip dialogue. The picture runs along with a steady flow of unusually well-knit incidents, which are woven together most expertly toward the end. This is owing to the fine writing of Mr. Kaufman and Miss Ferber...Veteran players of the stage, who have since been won over to talking pictures, are the principal assets in this film. It is a great pleasure to behold Marie Dressler away from her usual roles, dressed in the height of fashion and given lines that aroused gales of mirth from the first-night audience...

Miss Dressler is splendid as the wise Carlotta. Miss Burke's contribution to the story is all one could wish. She is the personification of an anxious hostess at one moment and subsequently a deeply disappointed woman. John Barrymore tackles his role with his usual artistry. His acting during Larry's last moments is most effective. Mr. Beery fits into the role of Dan Packard as though it were written especially for him and Miss Harlow makes the most of the part of Kitty.

In its review, Variety also praised the film's storyline and performances. It highlighted Dressler's role as well, although the influential entertainment trade weekly focused its compliments chiefly on Harlow's portrayal of Kitty:

The story grips from beginning to end with never relaxing tension, its somber moments relieved by lighter touches into a fascinating mosaic for nearly two hours ... Acting honors probably will go to Miss Dressler and Miss Harlow, the latter taking hold of her fat role and making it stand out, even in this distinguished company by the astonishingly well-balanced treatment of Kitty, the canny little hussy who hooks a hard-bitten and unscrupulous millionaire and then makes him lay down and roll over. By long odds the best thing Miss Harlow has done to date.

Pauline Kael wrote: "Jean Harlow, with her bee-stung pucker and her tinny voice, at her comic best." Leonard Maltin gave it four of four stars: "Vintage MGM constellation of stars portray various strata of society in N.Y.C., invited to dine and shine; Harlow in fine comedy form, but Dressler as dowager steals focus ... " Leslie Halliwell gave it a rare three of four stars: "Artificial but compelling pattern play from a Broadway success."

== Awards and honors ==
Dinner at Eight was voted one of the ten best pictures of 1934 by Film Daily's annual poll of critics.

In 2000, American Film Institute included the film in the list AFI's 100 Years...100 Laughs at number 85.

In 2023, the film was deemed "culturally, historically, or aesthetically significant" by the Library of Congress and selected for preservation in the National Film Registry.

== Come to Dinner parody ==
Come to Dinner, 22 minutes in length, is a 1934 Broadway Brevity parody of Dinner at Eight using look-alike actors. It is included in the 2005 Warner Video DVD release of Dinner at Eight. Some of the more prominent cast members parodied—along with their lesser known lookalikes—include Leda Léa's Jean Harlow, Flavia Arcaro's Marie Dressler, Herschel Mayall's Lionel Barrymore, John Bohn's John Barrymore, Curtis Karpe's Wallace Beery, Ninon Bunyoa's Billie Burke, Margot Stevenson's Madge Evans, and Charles Cannefax's Edmund Lowe.

== 1989 remake ==
A television film remake starring Lauren Bacall, Charles Durning, Ellen Greene, Harry Hamlin, John Mahoney and Marsha Mason was broadcast on TNT Channel on December 11, 1989. It was directed by Ron Lagomarsino.

== Frasier homage ==
The movie is pastiched in the third episode of the sitcom Frasier, using the same title for its episode. John Mahoney (who was in the TV remake) also features in the episode.

== See also ==
- National Recovery Administration (NRA), the logo displayed at start of film
