= Dinner at Eight (play) =

1932 American play by George S. Kaufman and Edna Ferber

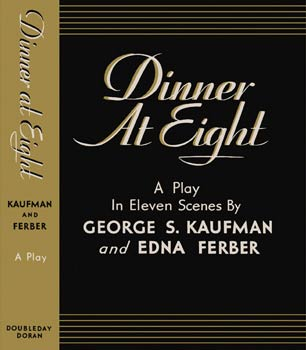
- First edition 1932
- Written by: George S. Kaufman; Edna Ferber

Premiere
- Date: October 22, 1932
- Place: Music Box Theatre, New York City

Dinner at Eight is a 1932 American play by George S. Kaufman and Edna Ferber. The plot deals with the Jordan family, who are planning a society dinner, and what they, as well as various friends and acquaintances—all of whom have their own problems and ambitions—do as they prepare for the event. The film adaptation Dinner at Eight followed, and Mentone Productions released a spoof, Supper at Six. Several revivals, a made-for-TV movie, and an opera followed.

== 1932 Broadway production ==
Dinner at Eight, a three act Broadway play, opened October 22, 1932, at the Music Box Theatre, and closed May 6, 1933, after 232 performances. The play was produced by Sam H. Harris, staged by George S. Kaufman; assistant director: Robert B. Sinclair. It marked the Broadway debut of Cesar Romero.To date the original 1932 Broadway production of Dinner at Eight has had the longest run with 232 performances vs. the 1933, 1966 and 2002 revivals with 218, 127 and 45 performances, respectively.

Main cast:

- Ann Andrews as Millicent Jordan
- Marguerite Churchill as Paula Jordan
- Constance Collier as Carlotta Vance
- Malcolm Duncan as Oliver Jordan
- Austin Fairman as Dr J. Wayne Talbot
- Cesar Romero as Ricci
- Paul Harvey as Dan Packard
- Sam Levene as Max Kane
- Conway Tearle as Larry Renault
- Judith Wood as Kitty Packard
- Olive Wyndham as Lucy Talbot

== 1933 London production ==
The original West End production of Dinner at Eight opened at the Palace Theatre on January 6, 1933, and ran for 218 performances, directed by Kaufman and produced by Charles B. Cochran. Incidental music was composed by Hyam Greenbaum. The sets were designed by Livingston Platt.

Main cast:

- Irene Vanbrugh as Millicent Jordan
- Jane Baxter as Dora
- Ivan Brandt as Gustave
- Tristan Rawson as Oliver Jordan
- Margaret Vines as Paula Jordon
- Leslie Perrins as Ricci
- Mabel Terry-Lewis as Hattie Loomis
- Edie Martin as Miss Copeland
- Laura Cowie as Carlotta Vance
- Lyn Harding as Dan Packard
- Carol Goodner as Kitty Packard
- Marjorie Gabain as Tina
- Martin Lewis as Dr J. Wayne Talbot
- Basil Sydney as Larry Renault
- Susan Richmond as Miss Alden
- Juliet Mansel as Lucy Talbot
- Dora Gregory as Mrs Wendel

== 1966 Broadway revival ==
The revival opened on Broadway on September 27, 1966, at the Alvin Theatre and closed on January 14, 1967, after 127 performances.

Produced by Elliot Martin, Lester Osterman Jr., Alan King and Walter A. Hyman, Ltd. The play was directed by Tyrone Guthrie.

Main cast

- Judith Barcroft as Paula Jordan
- Robert Burr as Dan Packard
- Mindy Carson as Lucy Talbot
- Arlene Francis as Carlotta Vance
- June Havoc as Millicent Jordan
- Phil Leeds as Max Kane
- Jeffrey Lynn as Dr J. Wayne Talbot
- Darren McGavin as Larry Renault
- Walter Pidgeon as Oliver Jordan
- Pamela Tiffin as Kitty Packard

== 2002 Broadway revival ==
The revival opened at the Vivian Beaumont Theater on December 19, 2002, and closed on January 26, 2003, after 45 performances and 28 previews. Produced by Lincoln Center Theater, André Bishop: Artistic Director; Bernard Gersten: Executive Producer. Directed by Gerald Gutierrez.

Main cast

- Joanne Camp as Lucy Talbot
- Kevin Conway as Dan Packard
- John Dossett as Dr. J. Wayne Talbot
- Christine Ebersole as Millicent Jordan
- Joe Grifasi as Max Kane
- Byron Jennings as Larry Renault
- James Rebhorn as Oliver Jordan
- Marian Seldes as Carlotta Vance
- Emily Skinner as Kitty Packard
- Samantha Soule as Paula Jordan
- David Wohl as Mr. Fitch

The play received 2003 Tony Award nominations for Best Revival of a Play, Best Featured Actress in a Play (Ebersole and Seldes), Best Scenic Design (John Lee Beatty), and Best Costume Design (Catherine Zuber).

== Adaptations ==
Adaptations of the play include:

- Dinner at Eight, a 1933 film directed by George Cukor
- "Dinner at Eight", a February 18, 1940 episode of The Campbell Playhouse, starring Orson Welles, Marjorie Rambeau, Hedda Hopper, and Lucille Ball
- "Dinner at Eight", a June 1, 1955, episode of Front Row Center on CBS television.
- Dinner at Eight, a 1989 made-for-TV film directed by Ron Lagomarsino
- Dinner at Eight, a 2017 opera by William Bolcom
