= List of awards and nominations received by Lauren Bacall =

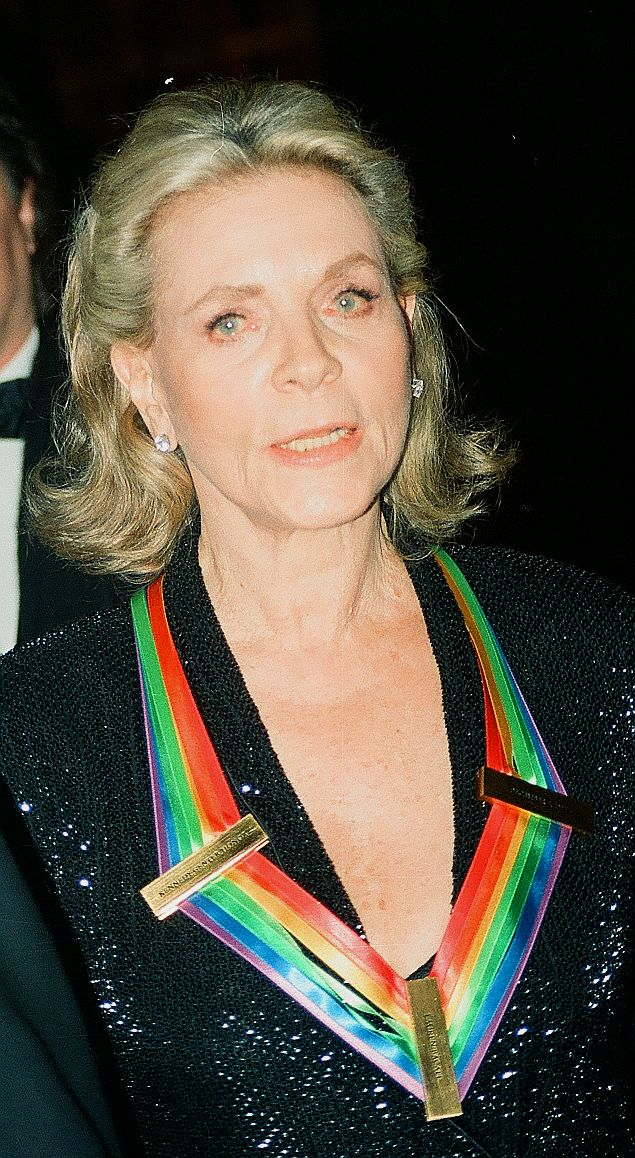
Bacall upon receiving the Kennedy Center Honors

In a career spanning seven decades, American actress Lauren Bacall achieved success in multiple fields of entertainment, and was recognized with Oscar, Emmy, and Grammy nominations for her work in film, television and music, respectively. Additionally, she was awarded two Tony Awards for her work on Broadway. She was the recipient of numerous honorary awards and accolades, including the Cecil B. DeMille Award, the Kennedy Center Honors, and the Academy Honorary Award.

== Major awards ==
Key
†	Indicates non-competitive categories

Organizations	Year (Note: Indicates the year of the ceremony.)	Category (Note: Indicates category name at the time of the ceremony; may differ from the current name of the category.)	Work	Result
Academy Awards	1997	Best Supporting Actress	The Mirror Has Two Faces	Nominated
Academy Awards	2010	Academy Honorary Award †	Lauren Bacall	Won
British Academy Film Awards	1977	Best Actress in a Leading Role	The Shootist	Nominated
British Academy Film Awards	1997	Best Actress in a Supporting Role	The Mirror Has Two Faces	Nominated
Critics' Choice Movie Awards	1997	Lifetime Achievement Award †	Lauren Bacall	Won
Golden Globe Awards	1993	Cecil B. DeMille Award †	Lauren Bacall	Won
Golden Globe Awards	1997	Best Supporting Actress – Motion Picture	The Mirror Has Two Faces	Won
Grammy Awards	1988	Best Spoken Word or Non-Musical Recording	Lauren Bacall: By Myself	Nominated
Grammy Awards	1997	Best Spoken Word or Non-Musical Album	Harry S. Truman: A Journey to Independence (with Martin Landau, Jack Lemmon, and Gregory Peck)	Nominated
Primetime Emmy Awards	1973	Outstanding Single Performance by an Actress in a Leading Role	Applause	Nominated
Primetime Emmy Awards	1980	Outstanding Lead Actress in a Drama Series	The Rockford Files	Nominated
Primetime Emmy Awards	1988	Outstanding Informational Special	Great Performances: Bacall on Bogart	Nominated
Screen Actors Guild Awards	1997	Outstanding Performance by a Female Actor in a Supporting Role	The Mirror Has Two Faces	Won
Tony Awards	1970	Best Actress in a Musical	Applause	Won
Tony Awards	1981	Best Actress in a Musical	Woman of the Year	Won

== Other Film and Television awards and nominations ==
=== American Comedy Awards ===
Year	Nominated work	Category	Result
1997	The Mirror Has Two Faces	Funniest Supporting Actress in a Motion Picture	Nominated

=== César du cinéma ===
Year	Nominated work	Category	Result
1996	—	Honorary César	Won

=== Laurel Awards ===
Year	Nominated work	Category	Result
1958	Designing Woman	Top Female Comedy Performance	3rd
1958	—	Top Female Star	11th

=== National Board of Review ===
Year	Nominated work	Category	Result
1994	Prêt-à-Porter	Best Acting by an Ensemble	Won
1991	—	Career Achievement Award	Won

=== Online Film & Television Association Awards ===
Year	Nominated work	Category	Result
2018	—	OFTA Film Hall of Fame	Won
1997	The Mirror Has Two Faces	Best Supporting Actress	Nominated

=== Online Film & Television Association Awards ===
Year	Nominated work	Category	Result
1999	Too Rich: The Secret Life of Doris Duke	Best Actress in a Motion Picture or Miniseries	Nominated

=== San Diego Film Critics Society ===
Year	Nominated work	Category	Result
1996	The Mirror Has Two Faces	Best Supporting Actress	Won

=== Satellite Awards ===
Year	Nominated work	Category	Result
1996	The Mirror Has Two Faces	Best Supporting Actress - Musical or Comedy	Nominated

=== 20/20 Awards ===
Year	Nominated work	Category	Result
2017	The Mirror Has Two Faces	Best Supporting Actress	Nominated

== Other Theatre awards and nominations ==
=== Drama Desk Awards ===
Year	Nominated work	Category	Result
1970	Applause	Outstanding Actress in a Musical	Won

=== Hasty Pudding Theatricals ===
Year	Nominated work	Category	Result
1967	—	Hasty Pudding Woman of the Year	Won

=== Sarah Siddons Award ===
Year	Nominated work	Category	Result
1984	—	Actress of the Year	Won
1972	—	Actress of the Year	Won

== Film Festival Awards ==
=== Berlin International Film Festival ===
Year	Nominated work	Category	Result
1997	—	Berlinale Camera	Won

=== Karlovy Vary International Film Festival ===
Year	Nominated work	Category	Result
1998	—	Lifetime Achievement Award	Won

=== Norwegian International Film Festival ===
Year	Nominated work	Category	Result
2007	—	Lifetime Achievement Award	Won

=== Palm Springs International Film Festival ===
Year	Nominated work	Category	Result
1997	—	Lifetime Achievement Award	Won

=== San Sebastián International Film Festival ===
Year	Nominated work	Category	Result
1992	—	Donostia Award	Won

=== Stockholm International Film Festival ===
Year	Nominated work	Category	Result
2000	—	Lifetime Achievement Award	Won

== Other honors ==
Year	Honor	Organization	Notes
2008	Bette Davis Medal of Honor	Bette Davis Foundation	
2005	Frontier Award	Austin Film Society	Accepted on behalf of the cast and crew of Written on the Wind
2000	Living Legend Award	Women's Image Network	
1999	AFI's 100 Years...100 Stars	American Film Institute	20th place
1998	Honorary Degree in Human Letters	Columbia University	
1998	American Theater Hall of Fame	American Theatre Critics Association	
1997	Kennedy Center Honors	Kennedy Center	
1997	Golden Palm Star	Palm Springs Walk of Stars	
1995	Commandeur de l'Ordre des Arts et des Lettres	Ministère de la Culture	
1994	Muse Award	New York Women in Film & Television	
1990	George Eastman Award	George Eastman Museum	
1984	Premio Rodolfo Valentino	--	
1980 (Note: This was the 1980 award for hardcover Autobiography. From 1980 to 1983, in National Book Award history, there were dual hardcover and paperback awards in most categories, and multiple nonfiction subcategories. Most of the paperback award-winners were reprints, including the 1980 Autobiography.)	National Book Award for Autobiography	National Book Foundation	for Lauren Bacall by Myself
1979	Prix littéraire Lucien Barrière	Festival du cinéma américain de Deauville	for Lauren Bacall by Myself
1960	Hollywood Walk of Fame Star	Hollywood Chamber of Commerce	located at 1724 Vine Street
