= Dinner at Eight (1989 film) =

- Genre: Comedy; Drama
- Based on: Dinner at Eight; 1932 play by: George S. Kaufman; Edna Ferber
- Screenplay by: Tom Griffin
- Directed by: Ron Lagomarsino
- Starring: Lauren Bacall; Charles Durning; Ellen Greene; Harry Hamlin; John Mahoney; Marsha Mason
- Composer: Jonathan Sheffer
- Country of origin: United States
- Original language: English

Production
- Producer: Bridget Terry
- Cinematography: Ronald M. Vargas Sr.
- Editor: Roy Watts
- Running time: 95 minutes
- Production company: Turner Pictures

Original release
- Network: TNT
- Release: December 11, 1989

Dinner at Eight is a 1989 American made-for-television comedy-drama film directed by Ron Lagomarsino and written by Tom Griffin. It is a remake of the 1933 film Dinner at Eight, which was based on the 1932 play of the same name by George S. Kaufman and Edna Ferber. The film stars Lauren Bacall, Charles Durning, Ellen Greene, Harry Hamlin, John Mahoney and Marsha Mason. The film premiered on TNT on December 11, 1989.

== Cast ==
- Lauren Bacall as Carlotta Vance
- Charles Durning as Dan Packard
- Ellen Greene as Kitty Packard
- Harry Hamlin as Larry Renault
- John Mahoney as Oliver Jordan
- Marsha Mason as Millicent Jordan
- Joel Brooks as Max Kane
- Stacy Edwards as Paula Jordan
- Tim Kazurinsky as Ed Loomis
- Bernadette Birkett as Hattie
- Ralph Bruneau as Dr. Wayne Talbot
- Lenore Kasdorf as Lucy Talbot
- William Newman as Alf
- Jane Alden as Ms. Copeland
- Loyda Ramos as Tina
- Julia Sweeney as Miss Wendell
- Kelly Connell as Dan's Assistant
- Richard Seff as Fosdick
- John Fleck as Plant Person
- Eddie Castrodad as Bobby
- Ben Meyerson as Waiter
- Theodore Lehmann as Gustave
- Rodney Scott Hudson as Wine Steward
- Bob Legionnaire as Norman Stengel
- Edward Penn as Fitch
- Richard Cummings Jr. as Hatfield
- Joseph Kell as Ernest
