= Mr. Broadway (TV series) =

American drama series (1964)

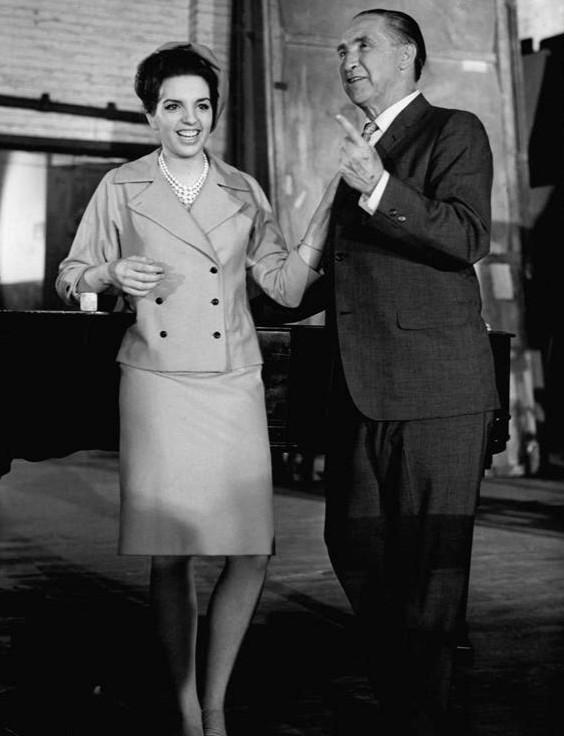
- Liza Minnelli with Horace McMahon in "Nightingale for Sale", 1964.
- Created by: Garson Kanin
- Starring: Craig Stevens; Lani Miyazaki; Horace McMahon
- Theme music composer: Dave Brubeck
- Opening theme: "Theme From 'Mr. Broadway'"
- Composer: Dave Brubeck
- Country of origin: United States
- No. of seasons: 1
- No. of episodes: 13

Production
- Executive producer: David Susskind
- Producer: Daniel Melnick
- Running time: 60 min.
- Production companies: Talent Associates, in association with the CBS Television Network

Original release
- Network: CBS
- Release: September 26 – December 26, 1964

Mr. Broadway is an American 13-episode CBS adventure and drama television series starring Craig Stevens as New York City public relations specialist Mike Bell. It ran from September 20, 1964 until December 26, 1964.

== Premise and cast ==
Stevens portrayed Mike Bell, whose Michael Bell Associates public-relations firm created and maintained for actors, politicians, and other high-profile people. Producer David Susskind described Bell as "a dynamic man of a thousand facets". Bell's assistant was former newspaperman Hank McClure, portrayed by Horace McMahon. Lani Miyazaki played Bell's girl Friday.

== Production ==
Playwright Garson Kanin wrote the script for the pilot episode of Mr. Broadway, and by September 1963, he had created synopses for 22 episodes. He was also a part-owner of the series. He based much of the content on elements of short stories that he had written.

Susskind and Daniel Melnick of Talent Associates-Paramount produced Mr. Broadway. Dave Brubeck composed musical scores for the episodes.

Kanin's involvement diminished after he wrote the first episode. He directed another episode, but his name did not appear among the screen credits thereafter. CBS ended production of the show after 13 episodes had been completed. It concluded with the December 26, 1964, broadcast. A representative of CBS said that filming of two more episodes was proposed, but Stevens rejected the idea.

Mr. Broadway was filmed at the Biograph studio in the Bronx. Locations used in filming included El Morocco, The Forum, the Four Seasons, the Rainbow Room, The Tavern on the Green, and The Tower Suites.

Sponsors included Procter & Gamble, Brown & Williamson, Lipton, Alberto-Culver, and Pontiac.

Mr. Broadway was one of a group of CBS Films series sold to Austarama for broadcast in Australia.

== Episodes ==
Episode list
| No. | Title | Directed by | Written by | Original release date |
|---|---|---|---|---|
| 1 | "An Eye on Emily" | Garson Kanin | Garson Kanin | September 26, 1964 |
Mike is asked by a friend from Cincinnati to serve as a guide for his daughter (Tuesday Weld) while she's in New York City.
| 2 | "Take a Walk Through a Cemetery" | Unknown | Unknown | October 3, 1964 |
A textile tycoon puts his family name in jeopardy, forcing Mike to help him out.
| 3 | "Try to Find a Spy" | Unknown | Unknown | October 10, 1964 |
Mike is fired by a client after he's accused of pirating the company's invention.
| 4 | "Between the Rats and the Finks" | Unknown | Unknown | October 17, 1964 |
A nightclub comic asks Mike for protection from a newspaper columnist.
| 5 | "Nightingale for Sale" | Unknown | Unknown | October 24, 1964 |
Mike helps launch the career of a young, unknown opera singer (Liza Minnelli).
| 6 | "The He-She Chemistry" | Unknown | Unknown | October 31, 1964 |
Settling a long-time theatrical feud is the job facing Mike.
| 7 | "Don't Mention My Name in Sheboygan" | Alex March | Robert Russell | November 7, 1964 |
A wheeler-dealer (Chester Morris) from the Midwest accuses Mike of blackmail.
| 8 | "Maggie, Queen of the Jungle" | Unknown | Unknown | November 21, 1964 |
Mike attempts to help a fading designer (Nina Foch) with her fashion show in order to help her regain her prestige.
| 9 | "Smelling Like a Rose" | Unknown | Unknown | November 28, 1964 |
Mike looks into a homicide in which an artist was found dead in the home of a wealthy publisher (Art Carney).
| 10 | "Bad Little Rich Girl" | Unknown | Unknown | December 5, 1964 |
A wealthy socialite (Diana van der Vlis) is on the verge of withdrawing her support of a boys' summer camp until Mike gets involved.
| 11 | "Sticks and Stones May Break My Bones" | Unknown | Unknown | December 12, 1964 |
A woman enlists Mike's help to try and get her daughter to love the politician she intends to marry.
| 12 | "Something to Sing About" | Unknown | Unknown | December 19, 1964 |
A down-and-out singer (Lauren Bacall) is given a new lease on life, thanks to Mike.
| 13 | "Pay Now, Die Later" | Unknown | Unknown | December 26, 1964 |
The owner of a hauling company (David Wayne) puts his life at risk with organized crime after he sells his business.
