= Lauren Bacall =

American actress (1924–2014)

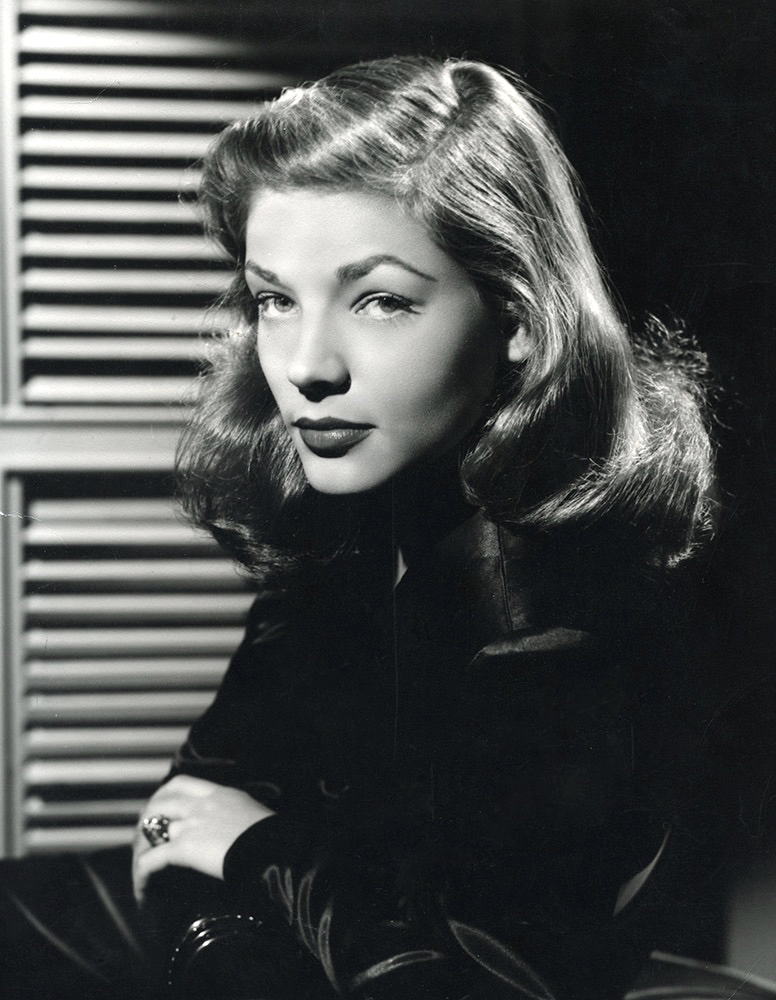
- Bacall in 1945
- Born: Betty Joan Perske; September 16, 1924; New York City, U.S.
- Died: August 12, 2014 (aged 89); New York City, U.S.
- Resting place: Forest Lawn Memorial Park, Glendale, California, U.S.
- Other name: Betty Bogart
- Occupation: Actress
- Years active: 1942–2014
- Works: Full list
- Spouses: Humphrey Bogart (m. 1945; died 1957); Jason Robards (m. 1961; div. 1969)
- Children: 3, including Stephen and Sam
- Relatives: Shimon Peres (second cousin); Tsvia Walden (second cousin once removed); Chemi Peres (second cousin once removed); Uzi Peres (second cousin once removed)
- Awards: Full list

Betty Joan Perske (September 16, 1924 – August 12, 2014), known professionally as Lauren Bacall (/bəˈkɔːl/ bə-KAWL), was an American actress. She was named the 20th-greatest female star of classic Hollywood cinema by the American Film Institute and was one of the last surviving major stars from the Golden Age of Hollywood cinema. She received an Academy Honorary Award in 2009 in recognition of her contribution to the Golden Age of motion pictures.

Bacall began a career as a model for the Walter Thornton Model Agency before making her film debut at the age of nineteen in To Have and Have Not (1944) as the leading lady opposite Humphrey Bogart, whom she later married. She continued in the film noir genre with appearances alongside Bogart in The Big Sleep (1946), Dark Passage (1947) and Key Largo (1948) and she starred in the romantic comedies How to Marry a Millionaire (1953) and Designing Woman (1957). She portrayed the female lead in Written on the Wind (1956), which is considered one of Douglas Sirk's seminal films. She later acted in Harper (1966), Murder on the Orient Express (1974) and The Shootist (1976).

Bacall found a career resurgence for her role in the romantic comedy The Mirror Has Two Faces (1996), for which she earned the Golden Globe Award and the Screen Actors Guild Award, in addition to nominations for the Academy Award and the BAFTA Award for Best Supporting Actress. During the final stage of her career, she gained newfound success with a younger audience for major supporting roles in the films Misery (1990), Dogville (2003), Birth (2004) and the English dubs of the animated films Howl's Moving Castle (2004) and Ernest & Celestine (2012).

In theater, Bacall made her Broadway debut in Johnny 2x4 (1942). She went on to win two Tony Awards for Best Actress in a Musical for her performances in Applause (1970) and Woman of the Year (1981). She also acted in the play Goodbye Charlie (1959), the farce Cactus Flower (1965) and Wonderful Town (1977). She made her West End debut in Applause (1970) followed by Sweet Bird of Youth (1985).

== Early life and education ==
Lauren Bacall was born Betty Joan Perske on September 16, 1924, in the Bronx, New York City, (Note: In a 1995 interview with Jeremy Isaacs, Bacall claimed to have never lived in the Bronx, though numerous sources state that she was born in the borough.) the only child of William Perske (1889–1982), who sold medical instruments, and Natalie (née Weinstein-Bacal; 1901–1969), a secretary who later legally changed her surname to Bacal. Both of her parents were Jewish. Her mother emigrated from Iași, Romania, through Ellis Island. Her father was born in New Jersey to parents who were born in Valozhyn, at that time a predominantly Jewish community in present-day Belarus.

Bacall's parents divorced when she was six, after which she no longer saw her father. She later took her mother's Romanian surname, Bacal, but added a fanciful "L". She was close to her mother, who married Lee Goldberg and moved to California after Bacall became a star. Through her father, Bacall was a second cousin of Shimon Peres (born Szymon Perski), the eighth prime minister and ninth president of Israel, through their shared patrilineal great-grandparents Yehuda and Elke Perski. Peres did not know about the relationship until Bacall told him.

Bacall's family moved soon after her birth to Brooklyn's Ocean Parkway. Wealthy uncles funded Bacall's education at the Highland Manor Boarding School for Girls in Tarrytown, New York, a private boarding school founded by philanthropist Eugene Heitler Lehman, and at Julia Richman High School in Manhattan.

== Early career and modeling ==
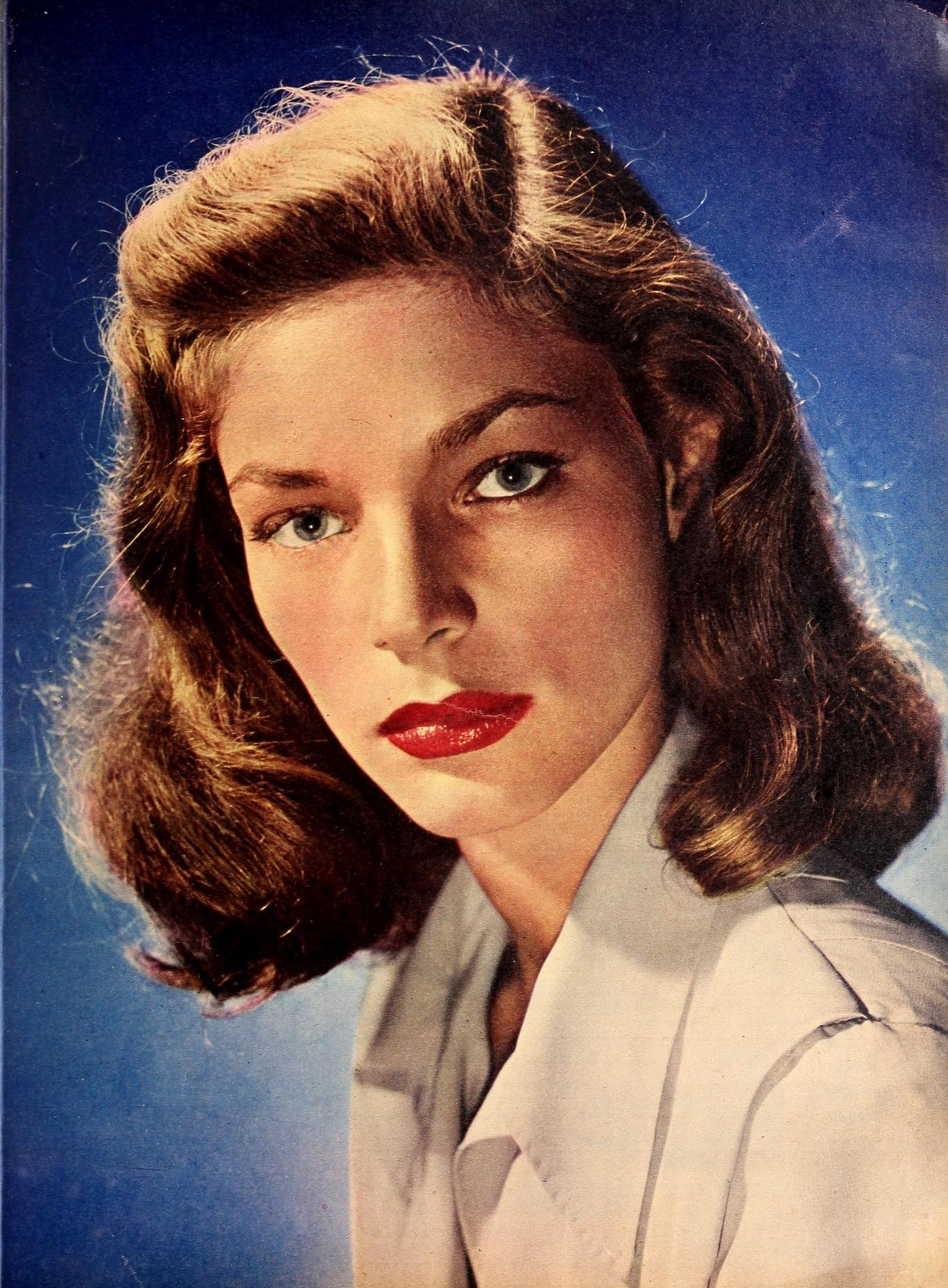
Bacall by László Willinger, 1946

In 1941, Bacall studied for a year at the American Academy of Dramatic Arts in New York, where she met classmate and future actor Kirk Douglas. She worked as an usher at the St. James Theatre and as a fashion model in department stores.

She made her acting debut on Broadway in 1942 at age 17 as a walk-on in Johnny 2x4. By then, she lived with her mother at 75 Bank Street and, in 1942, she was crowned Miss Greenwich Village. As a teenage fashion model, Bacall appeared on the cover of Harper's Bazaar and in magazines such as Vogue. A 1948 article in Life magazine referred to her "cat-like grace, tawny blonde hair and blue-green eyes."

Though Diana Vreeland is often credited with discovering Bacall for Harper's Bazaar, it was in fact Nicolas de Gunzburg who introduced Bacall to Vreeland. He had first met Bacall at a New York club called Tony's, where de Gunzburg suggested that Bacall visit his Harper's Bazaar office the next day. He then turned her over to Vreeland, who arranged for Louise Dahl-Wolfe to shoot Bacall in Kodachrome for the March 1943 cover.

The Harper's Bazaar cover caught the attention of "Slim" Keith, the wife of Hollywood producer and director Howard Hawks. Keith urged her husband to invite Bacall to take a screen test for his forthcoming film To Have and Have Not. Hawks asked his secretary to find more information about Bacall, but the secretary misunderstood and sent Bacall a ticket to travel to Hollywood for the audition.

== Hollywood ==
=== 1944–1959: Hollywood contract and leading roles ===
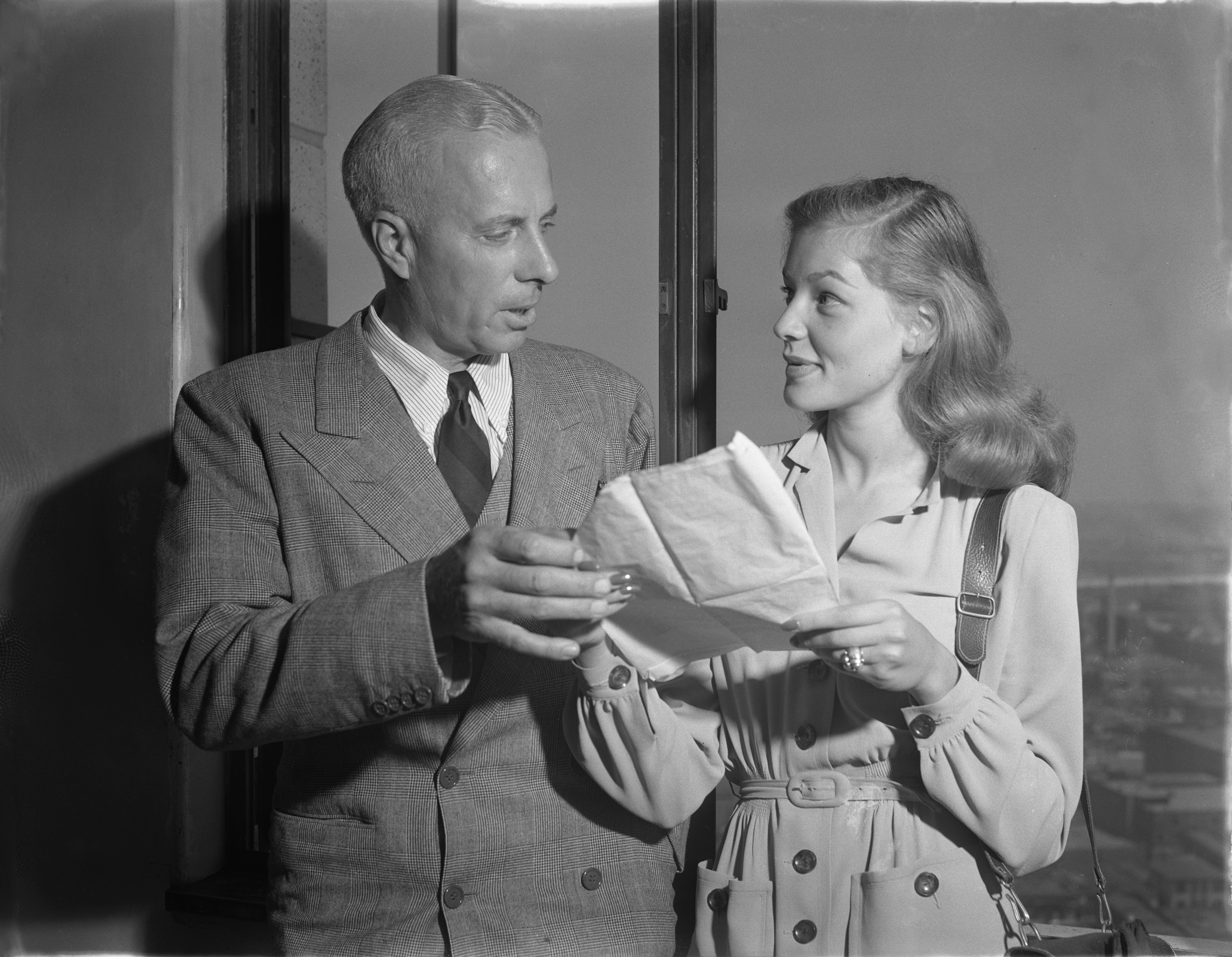
Howard Hawks and Bacall c. 1943

After meeting Bacall in Hollywood, Hawks immediately signed her to a seven-year contract with a weekly salary of $100 and personally began to manage her career. He changed her first name to Lauren, and she chose Bacall, a variant of her mother's maiden name, as her screen surname. Slim Hawks also took Bacall under her wing, dressing Bacall stylishly and guiding her in matters of elegance, manners and taste. At Hawks's suggestion, Bacall was trained by a voice coach to speak with a lower, deeper voice rather than her normally high-pitched, nasal voice. As part of her training, Bacall was required to shout verses of Shakespeare for hours every day. Her voice was characterized as a "smoky, sexual growl" by most critics and a "throaty purr". Bacall stood 5 feet 8 1/2 inches (1.74 metres), unusually tall for actresses of the era and a half-inch taller than Humphrey Bogart.

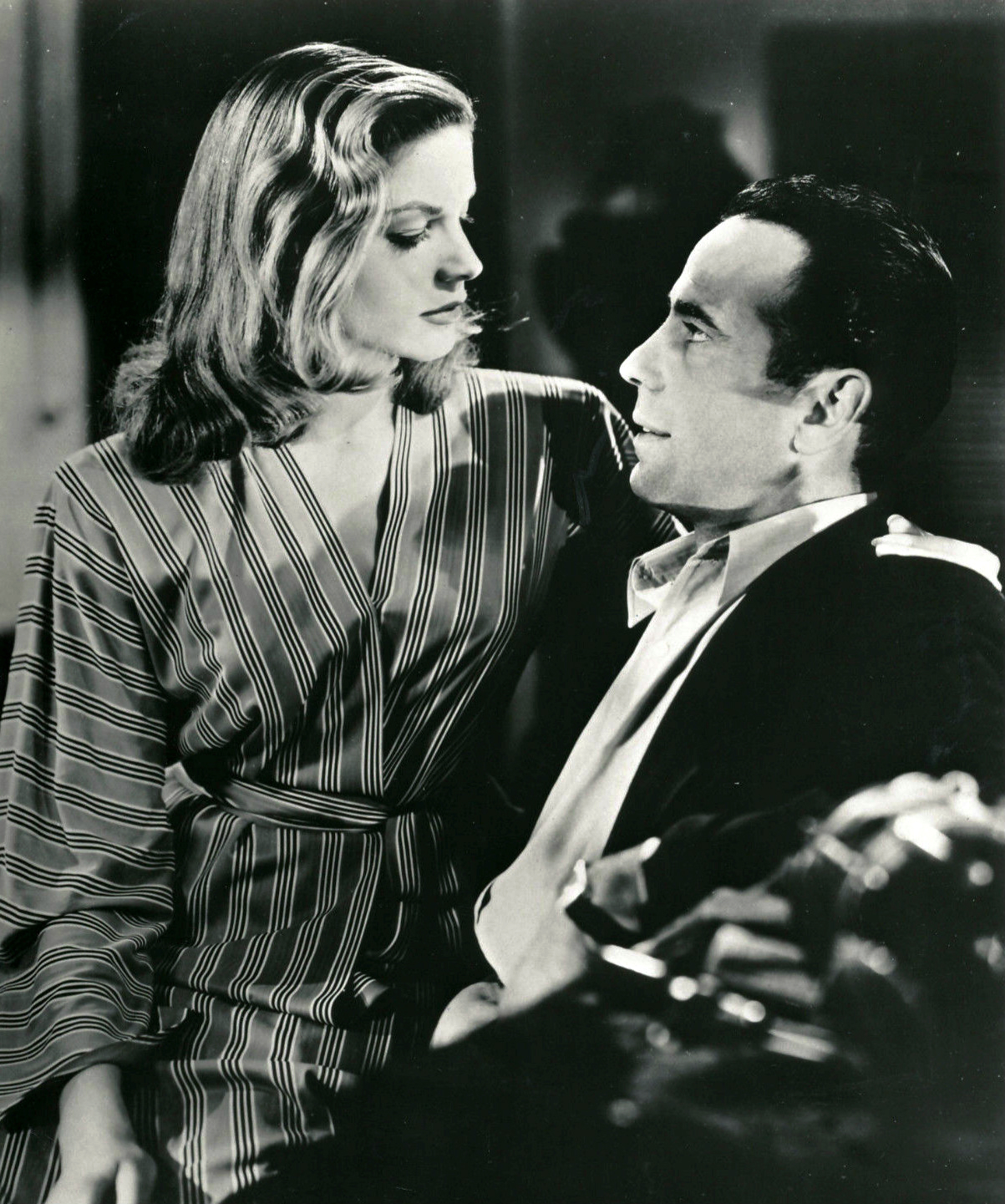
Bacall with Humphrey Bogart in To Have and Have Not

During her screen tests for To Have and Have Not (1944), Bacall was so nervous that, to minimize her quivering, she pressed her chin against her chest, faced the camera and tilted her eyes upward. This effect, which came to be known as "The Look", became another Bacall trademark, along with her sultry voice. Bacall's character in the film used Slim Hawks's nickname, "Slim" and Bogart used Howard Hawks's nickname "Steve". The on-set chemistry between the two was immediate, according to Bacall. She and Bogart, who was unhappily married to Mayo Methot, began a romantic relationship several weeks into shooting. Bacall's role in the script was originally much smaller, but during production, the part was revised and extended several times.

After its release, To Have and Have Not catapulted Bacall into instant stardom and her performance became the cornerstone of her star image that extended into popular culture at large, even influencing fashion as well as filmmakers and other actors. Warner Bros. launched an extensive marketing campaign to promote the picture and to establish Bacall as a movie star. As part of the public-relations push, Bacall visited the National Press Club in Washington, D.C., on February 10, 1945, and sat on a piano as Vice President Harry S. Truman played it.

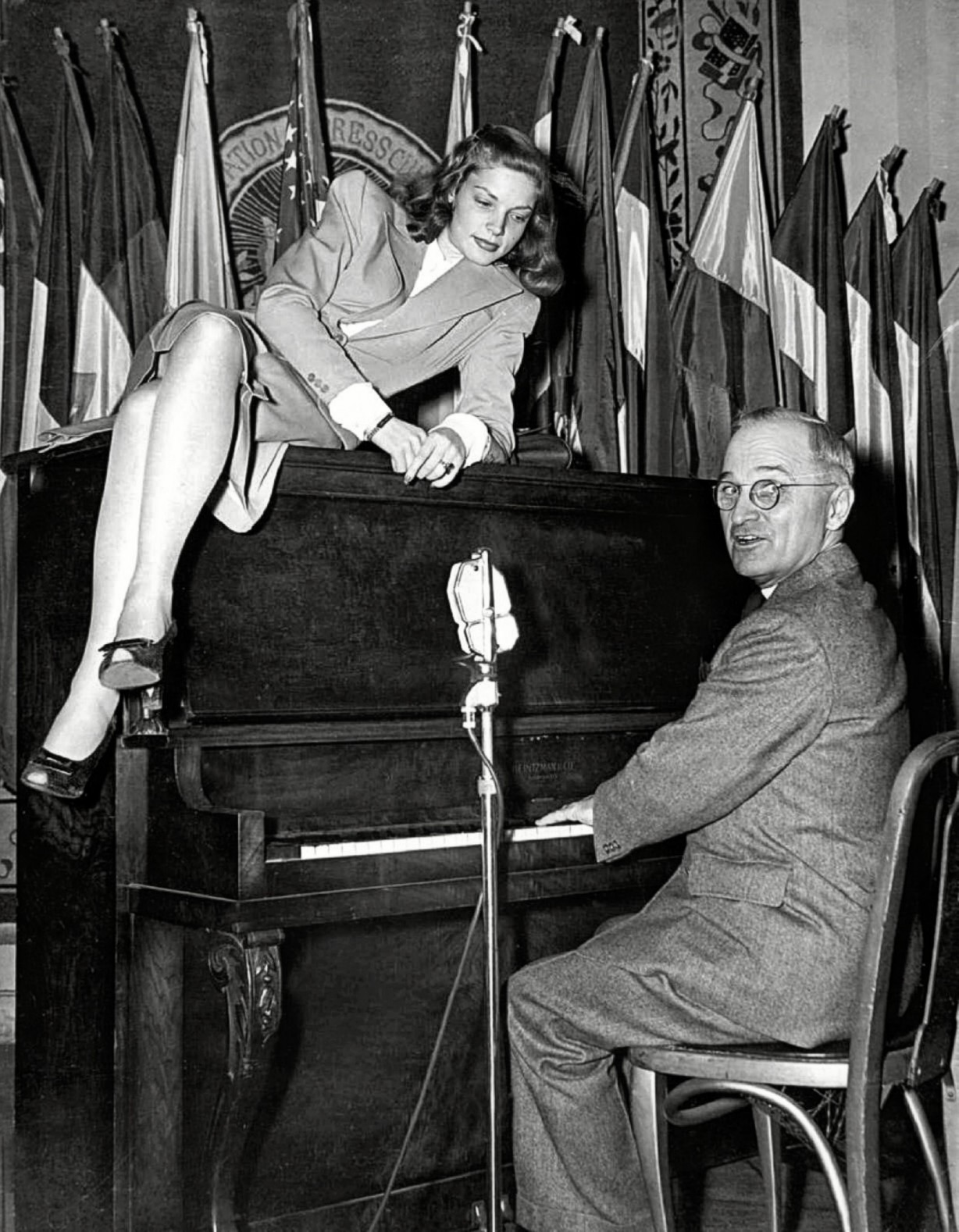
20-year-old Bacall lounges on top of the piano while Vice President Harry S. Truman plays for servicemen at the National Press Club Canteen in Washington, D.C. (February 10, 1945)

After To Have and Have Not, Bacall appeared with Charles Boyer in Confidential Agent (1945), which was poorly received by critics. By her own estimation, she had been terribly miscast and the film could have caused considerable damage to her career, but her next performance as the mysterious, acid-tongued Vivian Rutledge in Hawks's film noir The Big Sleep (1946), co-starring Bogart, provided a quick career resurgence. The Big Sleep laid the foundation for Bacall's status as an icon of film noir, with which she would be strongly associated for the rest of her career. She was often cast in roles that were variations of the independent and sultry femme fatale character of Vivian. As described by film scholar Joe McElhaney, "Vivian displays an almost total command of movement and gesture. She never crawls."

Bacall was cast with Bogart in two more films. In the film noir Dark Passage (1947), she played an enigmatic San Francisco artist. Bosley Crowther of The New York Times wrote: "Miss Bacall ... generates quite a lot of pressure as a sharp-eyed, knows-what-she-wants girl." Bacall appeared in John Huston's melodramatic suspense film Key Largo (1948) with Bogart, Edward G. Robinson and Lionel Barrymore. In the film, according to film critic Jessica Kiang, "Bacall brings an edge of ambivalence and independence to the role that makes her character much more interesting than was written." Bacall and Bogart were parodied in the Warner Brothers Merrie Melodies shorts Bacall to Arms (1946) and Slick Hare (1947).

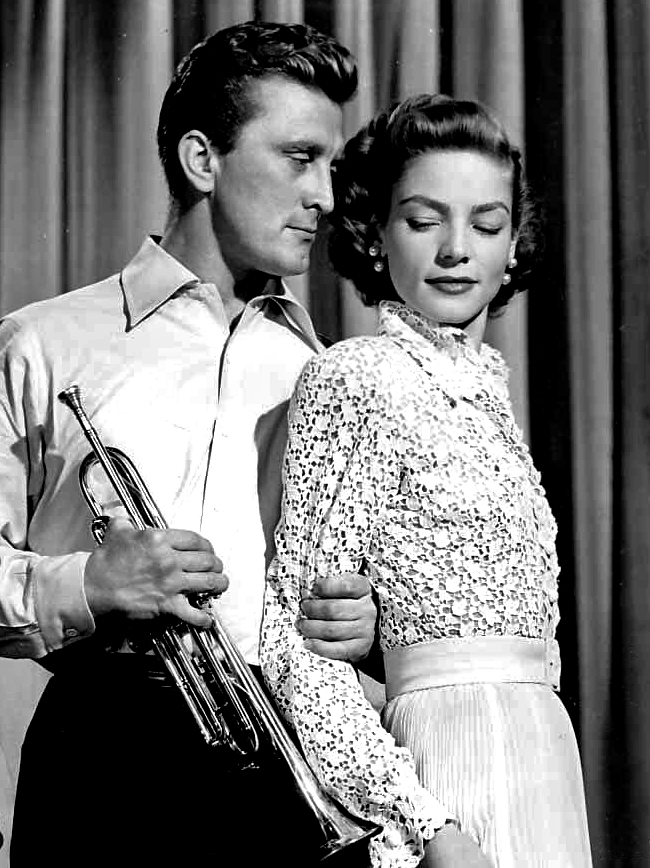
Bacall alongside Kirk Douglas in the film Young Man with a Horn (1950)

Bacall rejected scripts that she did not find interesting and thereby earned a reputation of being difficult. However, she further solidified her star status in the 1950s by appearing as the leading lady in a string of films that won favorable reviews. Bacall was cast with Gary Cooper in Bright Leaf (1950) and as a two-faced femme fatale in Young Man with a Horn (1950), a jazz musical co-starring Kirk Douglas, Doris Day and Hoagy Carmichael. From 1951 to 1952, Bacall costarred with Bogart in the syndicated action-adventure radio series Bold Venture.

Bacall starred in the first CinemaScope comedy, How to Marry a Millionaire (1953), a runaway hit among critics and at the box office that was directed by Jean Negulesco. She received positive notices for her turn as witty gold-digger Schatze Page. "First honors in spreading mirth go to Miss Bacall," wrote Alton Cook in the New York World-Telegram & Sun, "The most intelligent and predatory of the trio, she takes complete control of every scene with her acid delivery of viciously witty lines." After the success of How to Marry a Millionaire, Bacall declined the opportunity to press her handprints and footprints in the Grauman's Chinese Theatre's famed cement forecourt. She felt that "anyone with a picture opening could be represented there, standards had been so lowered" and did not feel that she had yet achieved the status of a major star and was thereby unworthy of the honor: "I want to feel I've earned my place with the best my business has produced."

Marilyn Monroe, Betty Grable and Bacall in How to Marry a Millionaire (1953)

Bacall was under contract to 20th Century-Fox. Following How to Marry a Millionaire, she appeared in yet another CinemaScope comedy directed by Negulesco, Woman's World (1954), which failed to match its predecessor's success at the box office. A television version of Bogart's early film success The Petrified Forest was performed as a 1955 live installment of the weekly dramatic anthology Producers' Showcase, featuring Bogart in his original role of Duke Mantee and starring Bacall and Henry Fonda. In the late 1990s, Bacall donated the only known kinescope of the performance to the Museum of Television & Radio (now the Paley Center for Media), where it remains archived for viewing in New York City and Los Angeles. Bacall starred in two feature films, The Cobweb and Blood Alley, both released in 1955. Directed by Vincente Minnelli, The Cobweb takes place at a mental institution where Bacall's character works as a therapist. It was her second collaboration with Charles Boyer and the film also stars Richard Widmark and Lillian Gish. A New York Times critic wrote: "In the only two really sympathetic roles, Mr. Widmark is excellent and Miss Bacall shrewdly underplays."

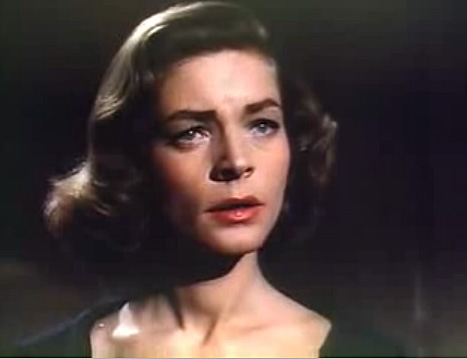
Bacall in Written on the Wind (1956)

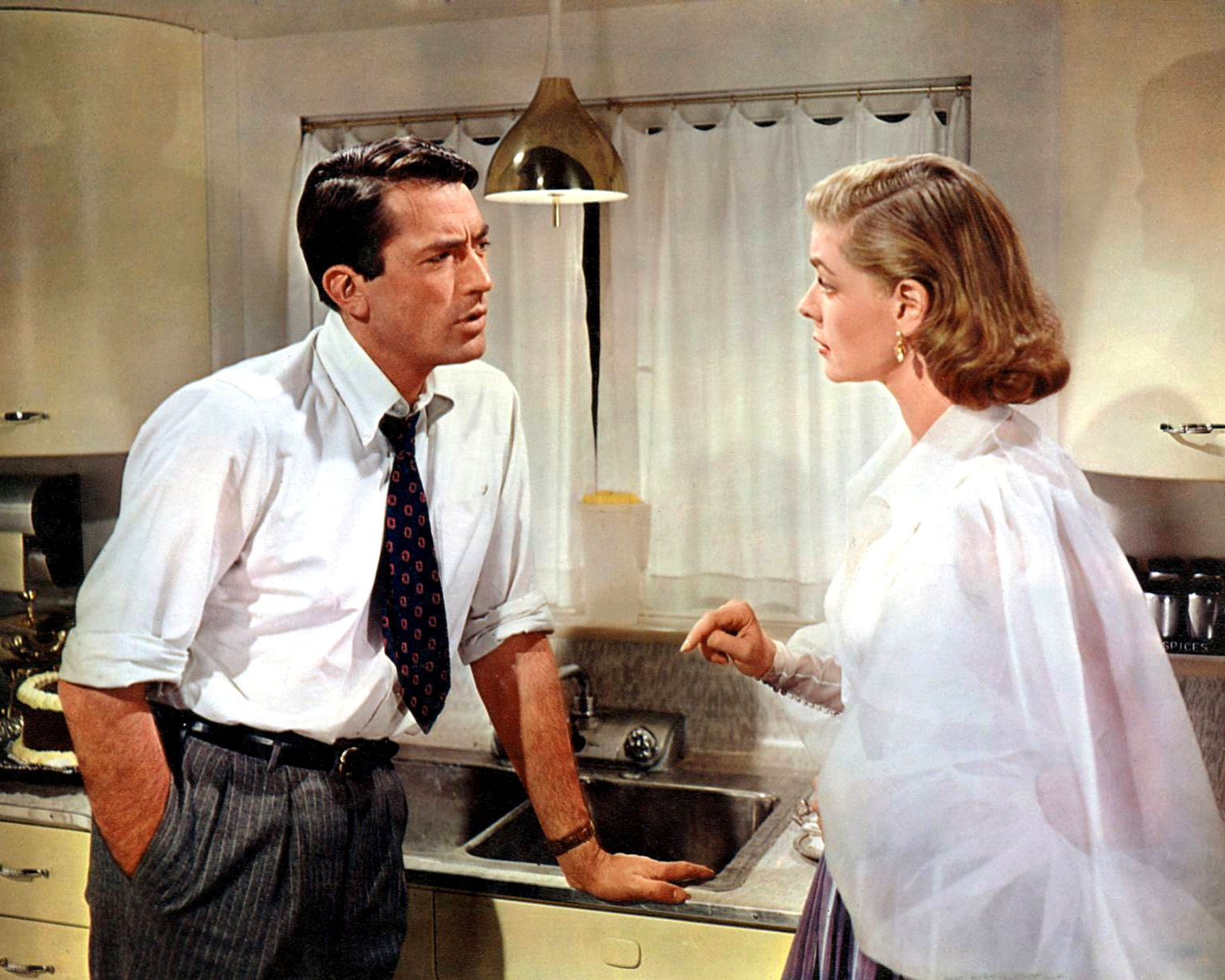
Bacall and Gregory Peck in the film Designing Woman (1957)

Many film scholars consider Written on the Wind (1956), directed by Douglas Sirk, a landmark melodrama. Appearing with Rock Hudson, Dorothy Malone and Robert Stack, Bacall plays a career woman whose life is unexpectedly turned around by a family of oil magnates. Bacall wrote in her autobiography that she did not think much of her role, but reviews were favorable. Variety wrote: "Bacall registers strongly as a sensible girl swept into the madness of the oil family." While supporting Bogart as he suffered from terminal esophageal cancer, Bacall starred with Gregory Peck in Designing Woman (1957) to solid reviews. The comedy was her second feature directed by Minnelli and was released in New York on May 16, 1957, four months after Bogart's death on January 14. Bacall appeared in two more films in the 1950s: the Negulesco-directed melodrama The Gift of Love (1958) with Robert Stack and the British adventure film North West Frontier (1959), which was a box-office hit.

=== 1960–1989: Return to Broadway and musicals ===
Bacall was seen in only a handful of films in the 1960s. She starred on Broadway in Goodbye, Charlie in 1959 and went on to a successful stage career. She played Stephanie in the farce Cactus Flower (1965). She won her first Tony Award for Best Actress in a Musical for her role as Margo Channing in Applause (1970). The musical was written by Betty Comden and Adolph Green. She performed the role both on Broadway and the West End. Walter Kerr of The New York Times praised her performance declaring, "Take your breath away? Indeed. What's more, she never gives it back." Applause was a musical version of the film All About Eve (1950), starring Bette Davis, Bacall's idol as a child. A young and unknown Bacall had met Davis years earlier in New York. After a performance of Applause, Davis visited Bacall backstage and told her, "You're the only one who could have played the part." Bacall would later win the Sarah Siddons Award in 1972 and 1984, an award inspired by the fictional trophy in All About Eve.

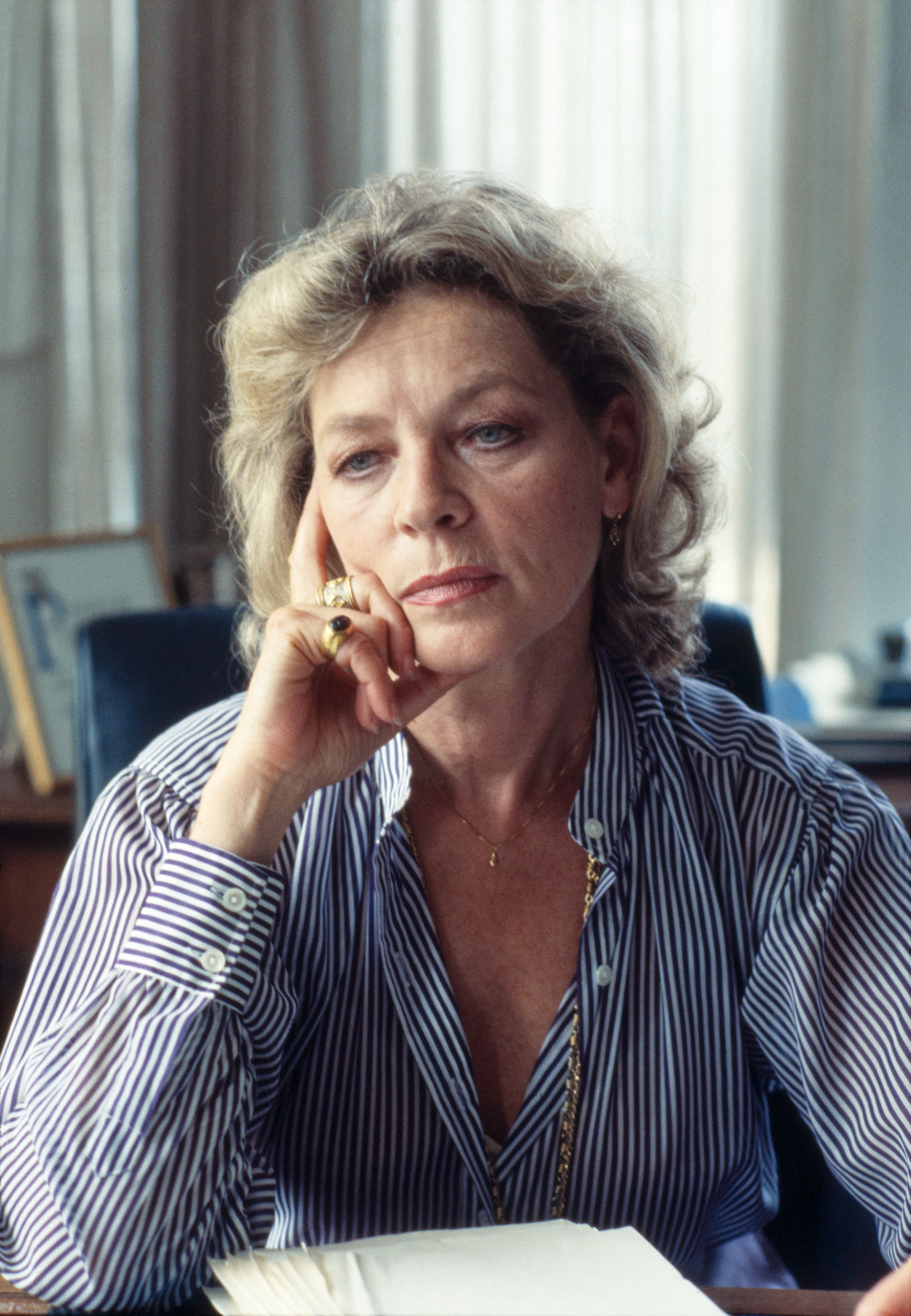
Bacall c. 1979 with the manuscript for her book, Lauren Bacall, By Myself

She returned to Broadway in the musical Woman of the Year (1981) with book by Peter Stone and music and lyrics by Kander and Ebb. The musical is based on the 1944 film of the same name starring Katharine Hepburn and Spencer Tracy. Frank Rich of The New York Times gave the production a mixed review but praised Bacall writing, "The people who concocted this musical know what their show is really about. Miss Bacall is on hand virtually the whole time and she's vibrant whether no-nonsense or tipsy, domineering or moony, dry or wet. If Woman of the Year is tired around the edges, it is always smart enough to keep its live wire center stage." She went on to win her second Tony Award for Best Actress in a Musical.

The few films in which Bacall appeared during this period were all-star vehicles such as Sex and the Single Girl (1964) with Henry Fonda, Tony Curtis and Natalie Wood; Harper (1966) with Paul Newman, Shelley Winters, Julie Harris, Robert Wagner and Janet Leigh; and Murder on the Orient Express (1974), with Ingrid Bergman, Albert Finney, Vanessa Redgrave, Martin Balsam and Sean Connery. In 1964, Bacall appeared in two episodes of Craig Stevens's Mr. Broadway: first in "Take a Walk Through a Cemetery" with husband Jason Robards, Jr. and later as Barbara Lake in the episode "Something to Sing About" with Balsam. In 1976, Bacall costarred in The Shootist with John Wayne, with whom she had worked in Blood Alley (1955).

Bacall was featured in Robert Altman's comedy Health (1980), which underwent a troubled process of release after the change of the top management at 20th Century-Fox and saw a very limited release in theaters. The following year, she appeared in the thriller The Fan (1981). The film received mixed reviews, especially following the recent murder of John Lennon and the similarities of the plot to the real event, but Bacall's performance gained a favorable reception. Variety magazine wrote that Bacall and director Edward Bianchi "make the audience care what happens" to her character. Bacall took a seven-year hiatus from films to perform on stage in Woman of the Year (1981) with costar Harry Guardino, for which she won her second Tony Award for Best Actress in a Musical and other shows such as a 1985 adaptation of Tennessee Williams's Sweet Bird of Youth under the direction of Harold Pinter. She returned to film in 1988 with supporting roles in Danny Huston's Mr. North and Michael Winner's Appointment with Death. She also starred in the British thriller Tree of Hands (1989), based on a novel by Ruth Rendell and in a television adaptation of the 1933 classic Dinner at Eight for Turner Television.

=== 1990–1999: Film resurgence and West End debut ===
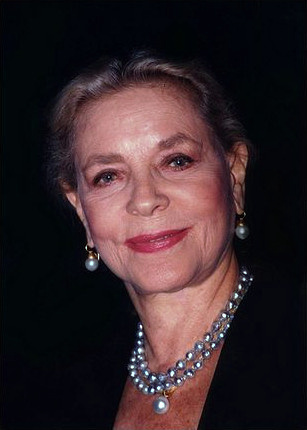
Bacall in Washington, D.C., 1998

In 1990, Bacall took a small but central role as James Caan's agent in Rob Reiner's Misery, based on the novel by Stephen Kingand an important role in the British television show, Fredrick Forsyth Presents: A Little Piece of Sunshine. The following year, Bacall played the lead in the independent film A Star for Two (1991) with Anthony Quinn, Lila Kedrova and Jean-Pierre Aumont and played a supporting role in All I Want for Christmas (1991).

In 1993, Bacall was very active in television, pairing again with her lifelong friend Gregory Peck and his daughter Cecilia Peck in Arthur Penn's television movie The Portrait and costarring with an all-star European cast in A Foreign Field. She appeared in Robert Altman's Prêt-à-Porter (1994), an ensemble film set in Paris during fashion week. In 1995, she was cast in her friend Ingrid Bergman's role in From the Mixed-Up Files of Mrs. Basil E. Frankweiler, a television remake of the 1973 movie by the same title. Years earlier, Bergman had played the role in the film version of Cactus Flower (1969) that Bacall had played on Broadway in 1965. In 1995, she portrayed Claire Zachanassian in the Friedrich Dürrenmatt play The Visit at the Chichester Festival.

1996 was a pivotal year for Bacall's career. She was chosen by Barbra Streisand to play her mother in the romantic comedy The Mirror Has Two Faces, also starring Jeff Bridges, George Segal and Brenda Vaccaro. Todd McCarthy of Variety wrote of her performance "Bacall, posing, rolling her eyes and snapping out the one-liners with consummate skill, is in to play the source of all of Rose's insecurities, the mother who was drop-dead gorgeous and who never told her kind of funny-looking daughter she was pretty." She received widespread critical acclaim and at age 72, she earned her first nomination for the Academy Award for Best Supporting Actress, which she was widely expected to win, but lost to Juliette Binoche for The English Patient. She also won the Golden Globe Award for Best Supporting Actress – Motion Picture and the Screen Actors Guild Award for Outstanding Performance by a Female Actor in a Supporting Role and a nomination for the BAFTA Award for Best Actress in a Supporting Role. That year, she recorded voiceovers for PBS's brand identity, which would continue to see use on its logos until 2002.

Bacall received the Kennedy Center Honors in 1997, and she was voted one of the 25 most significant female movie stars in history in 1999 by the American Film Institute. In 1999, Bacall starred on Broadway in a revival of Noël Coward's Waiting in the Wings. She portrayed American billionaire heiress Doris Duke in the four part CBS miniseries Too Rich: The Secret Life of Doris Duke (1999). In the 2000s, she acted as a spokesman for the Tuesday Morning discount chain and produced a jewelry line. She was also a celebrity spokesman for High Point coffee and Fancy Feast cat food.

=== 2000–2009: Dramatic films and final roles ===
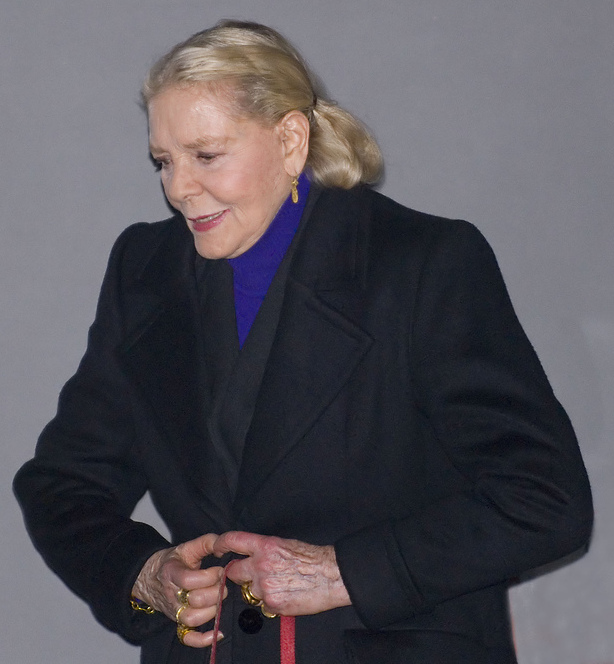
Bacall at a press conference for The Walker in February 2007

Her film career saw something of a renaissance taking dramatic roles in independent films. She attracted positive notices for her performances in high-profile psychological dramas such as Lars von Trier's Dogville (2003) and Jonathan Glazer's Birth (2004), both with Nicole Kidman. She voiced Witch of the Waste in Hayao Miyazaki's acclaimed animated film Howl's Moving Castle (2004). She was a leading actress in Paul Schrader's The Walker (2007). In March 2006, she introduced a film montage dedicated to film noir at the 78th Academy Awards. She made a cameo appearance as herself on The Sopranos in the April 2006 episode "Luxury Lounge", during which her character was mugged by Christopher Moltisanti (Michael Imperioli).

In September 2006, Bryn Mawr College awarded Bacall its Katharine Hepburn Medal, which recognizes "women whose lives, work and contributions embody the intelligence, drive and independence" of Hepburn. She delivered an address at the memorial service of Arthur M. Schlesinger Jr. at the Reform Club in London in June 2007. She finished her role in The Forger in 2009. The Academy of Motion Picture Arts and Sciences bestowed an honorary Academy Award upon Bacall at the inaugural Governors Awards on November 14, 2009. In July 2013, Bacall expressed interest in the film Trouble Is My Business. In November, she joined the English-dubbed voice cast for StudioCanal's animated film Ernest & Celestine. Her final role was in 2014 as a guest voice appearance in the Family Guy episode "Mom's the Word".

== Personal life ==
=== Relationships and family ===
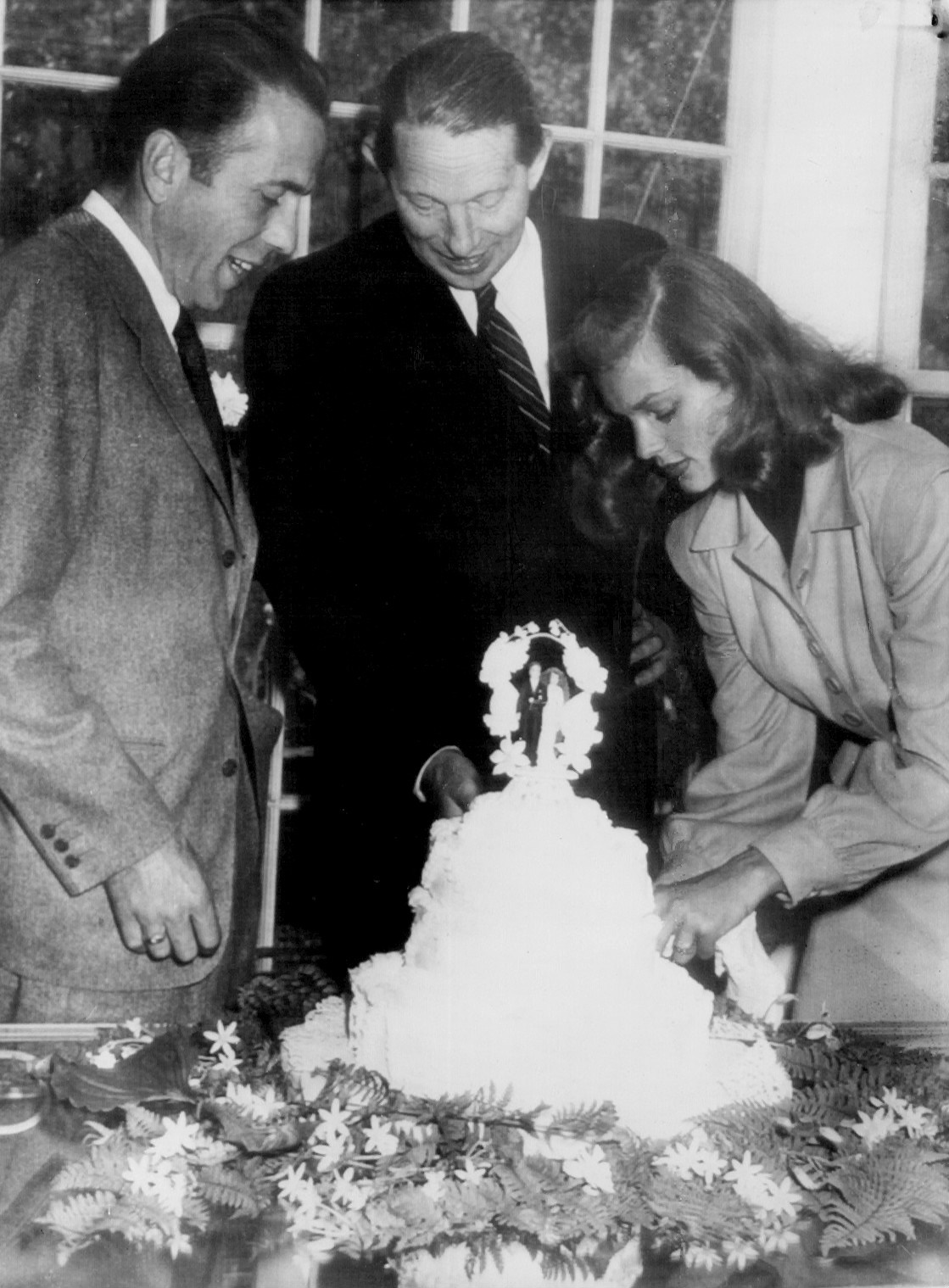
Best man Louis Bromfield (center) at the wedding of Humphrey Bogart and Lauren Bacall at Malabar Farm (May 21, 1945)

On May 21, 1945, Bacall married Humphrey Bogart; she was 20 and Bogart was 45. Their wedding and honeymoon took place at Malabar Farm, Lucas, Ohio, the country home of Pulitzer Prize–winning author Louis Bromfield, a close friend of Bogart. At the time of the 1950 United States census, the couple was living at 2707 Benedict Canyon Drive in Beverly Hills with their son and their nursemaid. Bacall is listed as Betty Bogart. She was married to Bogart until he died in 1957.

During the filming of The African Queen (1951), Bacall and Bogart became friends with Katharine Hepburn and Spencer Tracy. She began to mix in non-acting circles, becoming friends with the historian Arthur Schlesinger Jr. and the journalist Alistair Cooke. In 1952, she gave campaign speeches for Democratic presidential contender Adlai Stevenson. Along with other Hollywood figures, Bacall was a strong opponent of McCarthyism.

Bacall had a relationship with Frank Sinatra after Bogart's death. In an interview with Robert Osborne of Turner Classic Movies, Bacall stated that she had ended the romance, but, in her autobiography Lauren Bacall by Myself, she wrote that Sinatra ended the relationship abruptly after becoming upset that his marriage proposal had been leaked to the press, believing Bacall to be responsible. However, Bacall states in Lauren Bacall by Myself that when she was out with her friend Irving "Swifty" Lazar, they encountered the gossip columnist Louella Parsons, to whom Lazar revealed the news. Bacall wrote in By Myself that Sinatra found out the truth only years later.

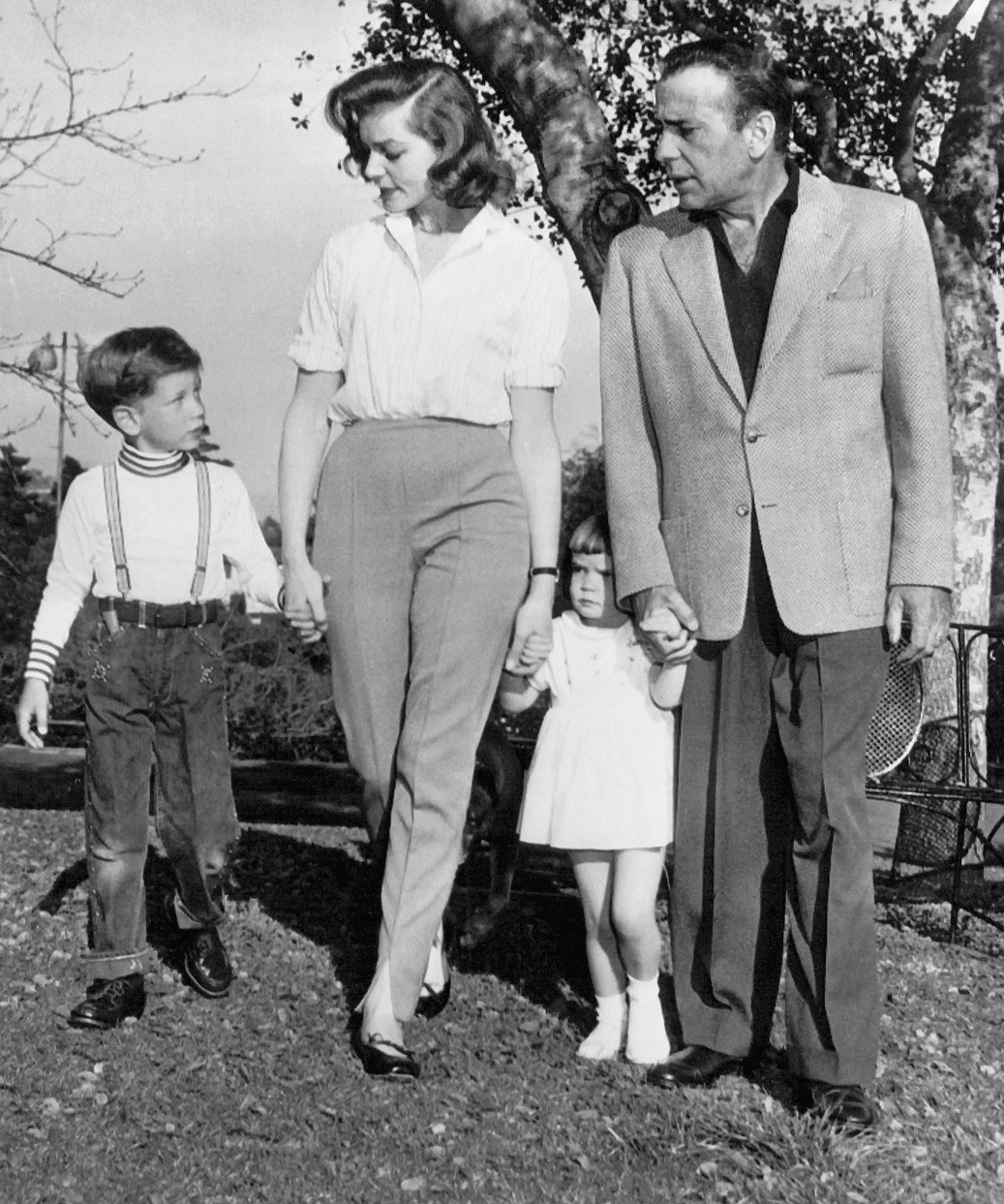
Bacall with Humphrey Bogart and their two children, Stephen Humphrey Bogart and Leslie, 1956

Bacall then met, and began a relationship with, Jason Robards. Their wedding was originally scheduled to take place in Vienna, Austria, on June 16, 1961. The wedding plans were shelved after Austrian authorities refused to grant the couple a marriage license, due to Robards being unable to produce divorce documents from his previous marriage and Bacall being unable to produce Humphrey Bogart's death certificate. They were also refused a marriage in Las Vegas, Nevada, due to similar documentation issues. On July 4, 1961, the couple drove to Ensenada, Mexico, where they wed. The couple divorced in 1969. According to Bacall's autobiography, she divorced Robards mainly because of his alcoholism.

Bacall had a romantic relationship with her Woman of the Year costar Harry Guardino in the early 1980s.

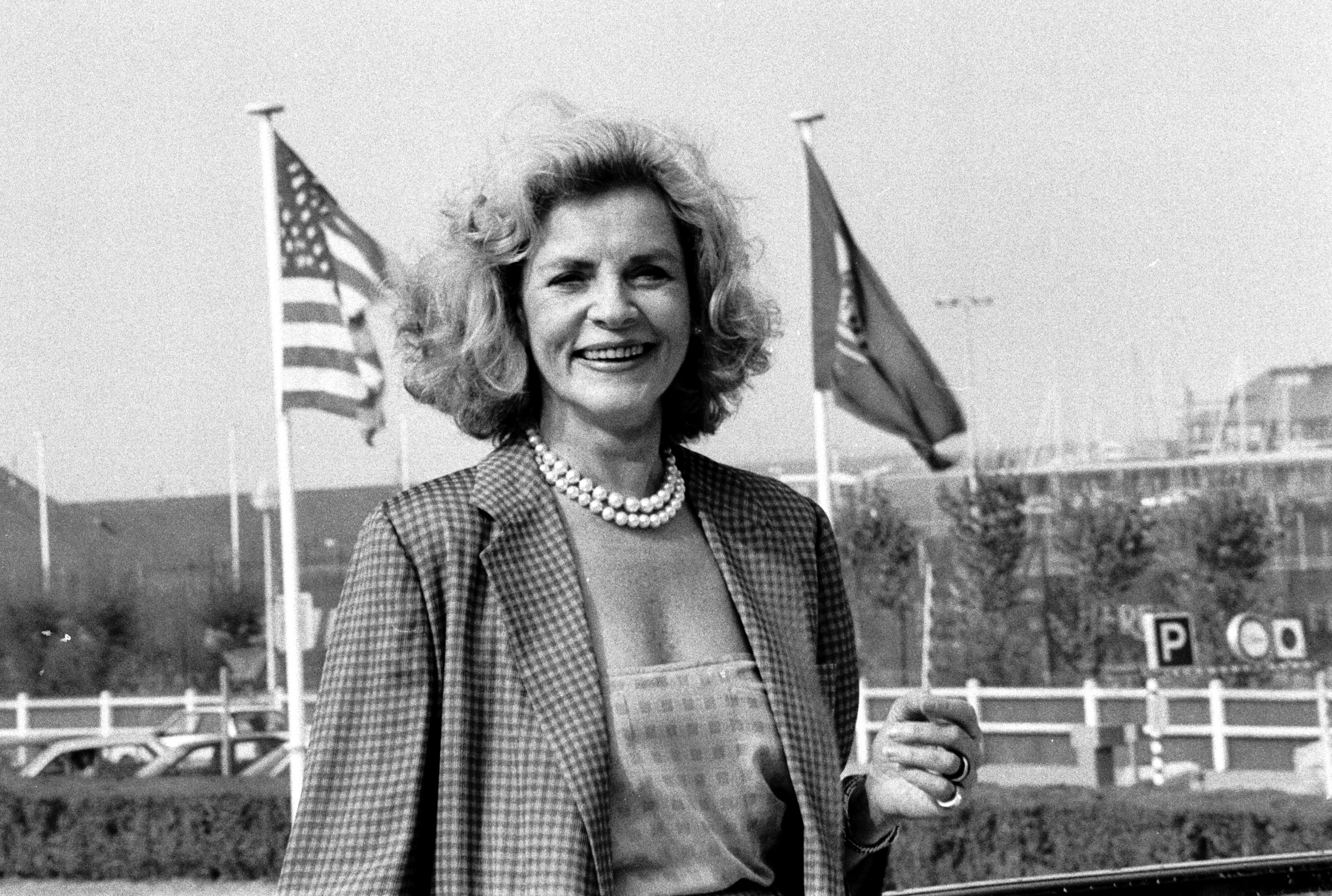
Bacall at the Deauville American Film Festival, 1989

Bacall had two children with Bogart and one with Robards. Her son Stephen Humphrey Bogart (born January 6, 1949) is a news producer, documentary film maker and author. Her daughter Leslie Howard Bogart (born August 23, 1952) is named after the actor Leslie Howard. A nurse and yoga instructor, Leslie is married to Erich Schiffmann. In his 1995 memoir, Stephen Bogart wrote, "My mother was a lapsed Jew and my father was a lapsed Episcopalian" and that he and his sister were raised Episcopalian "because my mother felt that would make life easier for Leslie and me during those post-World War II years". Sam Robards (born December 16, 1961), Bacall's son with Robards, is an actor.

Bacall wrote two autobiographies, Lauren Bacall by Myself (1978) and Now (1994). In 2006, the first volume of Lauren Bacall by Myself was reprinted as By Myself and Then Some with an extra chapter.

In a 1996 interview, Bacall, reflecting on her life, told the interviewer Jeremy Isaacs that she had been lucky:

I had one great marriage, I have three great children and four grandchildren. I am still alive. I still can function. I still can work ... You just learn to cope with whatever you have to cope with. I spent my childhood in New York, riding on subways and buses. And you know what you learn if you're a New Yorker? The world doesn't owe you a damn thing.

=== Political views ===
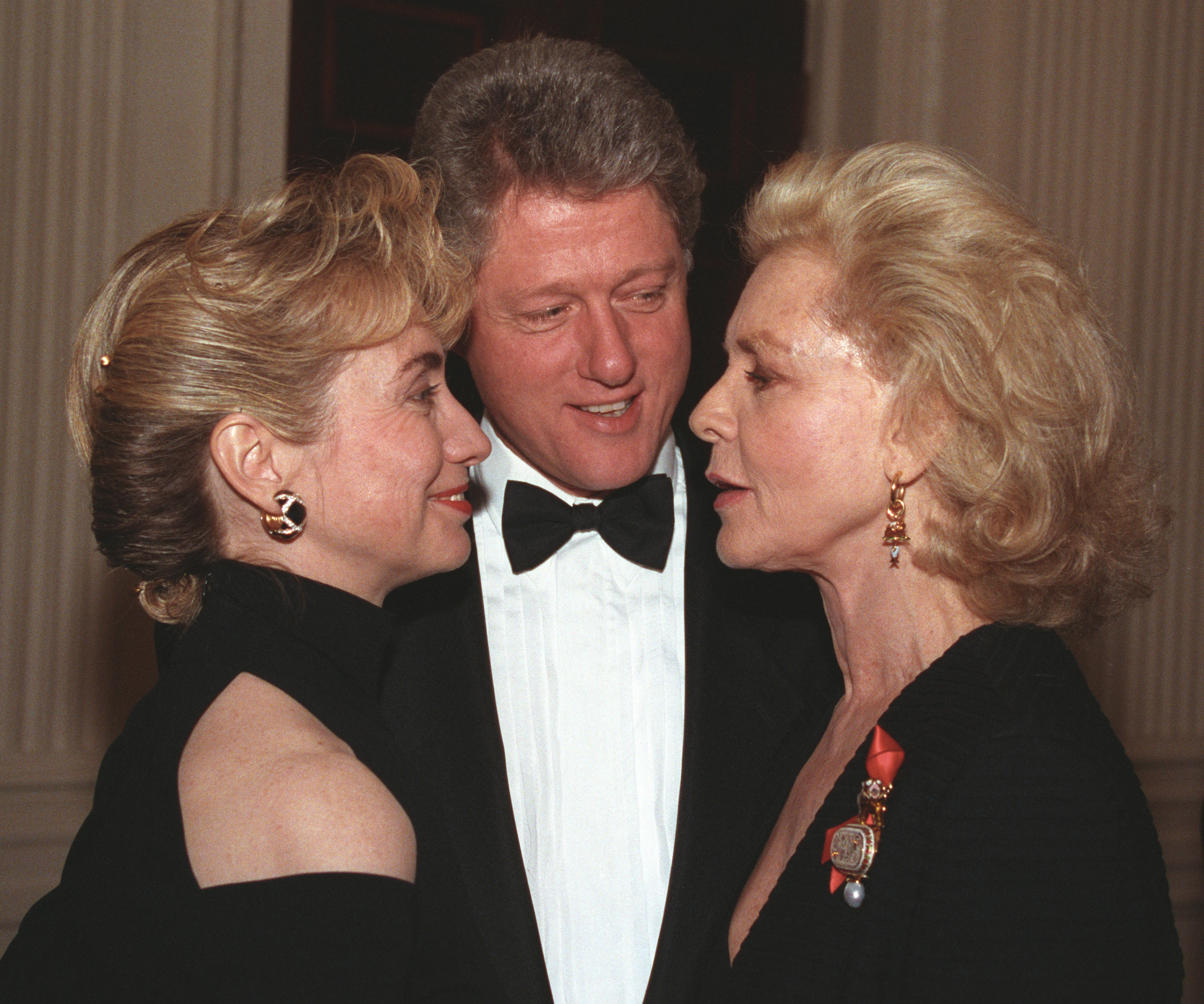
Bacall with Hillary and Bill Clinton in an event in the White House, January 1993

Bacall was a staunch liberal Democrat and proclaimed her political views on numerous occasions. Bacall and Bogart were among about 80 Hollywood personalities to send a telegram protesting the House Un-American Activities Committee's investigations of Americans suspected of adhering to communism. The telegram said that investigating individuals' political beliefs violated the basic principles of American democracy. In October 1947, Bacall and Bogart traveled to Washington, D.C., along with a number of other Hollywood stars in the Committee for the First Amendment (CFA), which also included Danny Kaye, John Garfield, Gene Kelly, John Huston, Groucho Marx, Olivia de Havilland, Ira Gershwin and Jane Wyatt.

She appeared alongside Humphrey Bogart in a photograph printed at the end of an article he wrote, titled "I'm No Communist", in the May 1948 edition of Photoplay magazine, written to counteract negative publicity resulting from his appearance before the House Committee. Bogart and Bacall distanced themselves from the Hollywood Ten and said: "We're about as much in favor of Communism as J. Edgar Hoover [is]."

Bacall campaigned for Democratic candidate Adlai Stevenson in the 1952 presidential election, accompanying him on motorcades along with Bogart and flying east to help in the final laps of Stevenson's campaign in New York and Chicago. She campaigned for Robert F. Kennedy in his 1964 run for the U.S. Senate and was part of a Hollywood committee that endorsed his presidential campaign.

In a 2005 interview with Larry King, Bacall described herself as "anti-Republican... A liberal. The L-word". She added that "being a liberal is the best thing on Earth you can be. You are welcoming to everyone when you're a liberal. You do not have a small mind."

=== Death ===
On August 12, 2014, Bacall died after suffering a stroke at her apartment in The Dakota, the Upper West Side building near Central Park in Manhattan. She was pronounced dead at New York–Presbyterian Hospital, at the age of 89.

Bacall was interred at Forest Lawn Memorial Park in Glendale, California. At the time of her death, Bacall had an estimated $26.6 million estate. The bulk of her estate was inherited by her children.

== Bibliography ==
- Lauren Bacall (1978). Lauren Bacall: By Myself. Knopf. ISBN 978-0394413082.
- Lauren Bacall (1994). Now. Knopf. ISBN 978-0394574127.
- Lauren Bacall (2006). By Myself and Then Some. Dey Street Books. ISBN 978-0061127915.

== See also ==
- Bogart–Bacall syndrome
- List of actors with Academy Award nominations
- List of actors with Hollywood Walk of Fame motion picture stars

== General and cited sources ==
- Bacall, Lauren (1979). By Myself. New York: Alfred A. Knopf. ISBN 978-0-394-41308-2.
- By Myself and Then Some (Revised ed.). New York: HarperCollins. 2005. ISBN 978-0-061-12791-5.
