= The Mirror Has Two Faces =

1996 film by Barbra Streisand

- Theatrical release poster
- Directed by: Barbra Streisand
- Screenplay by: Richard LaGravenese
- Story by: Richard LaGravenese
- Based on: Le Miroir à deux faces by André Cayatte; Gérard Oury
- Produced by: Barbra Streisand; Arnon Milchan
- Starring: Barbra Streisand; Jeff Bridges; Pierce Brosnan; George Segal; Mimi Rogers; Brenda Vaccaro; Lauren Bacall
- Cinematography: Dante Spinotti; Andrzej Bartkowiak
- Edited by: Jeff Werner
- Music by: Marvin Hamlisch
- Production company: TriStar Pictures
- Distributed by: TriStar Pictures (through Sony Pictures Releasing)
- Release date: November 15, 1996
- Running time: 126 minutes
- Country: United States
- Language: English
- Budget: $42 million
- Box office: $82 million

The Mirror Has Two Faces is a 1996 American romantic comedy-drama film produced and directed by Barbra Streisand, who also stars. The screenplay by Richard LaGravenese is loosely based on the 1958 French film Le Miroir à deux faces written by French filmmakers André Cayatte and Gérard Oury. In addition to Streisand, the film's cast includes Jeff Bridges, Pierce Brosnan, George Segal, Mimi Rogers, Brenda Vaccaro, and Lauren Bacall.

The plot follows a shy, middle-aged professor (Bridges) who pursues a platonic relationship with an unlucky-in-love colleague (Streisand).

The film was released in the United States by TriStar Pictures (through Sony Pictures Releasing) on November 15, 1996, and grossed $82 million. Streisand, Marvin Hamlisch, Robert John "Mutt" Lange, and Bryan Adams composed the film's theme song "I Finally Found Someone", a duet performed by Streisand and Adams.

== Plot ==
Rose Morgan, a middle-aged English literature professor at Columbia University, lives with her vain, overbearing, widowed mother, Hannah. While attending her sister Claire's third wedding (to Rose's former crush Alex), Rose tells her best friend Doris that although she is certain she will never get married, she also believes it must feel wonderful to have a partner who truly knows her.

Gregory Larkin is a Columbia math professor unable to connect with his students and who loses perspective when aroused by an attractive woman. Shortly after Gregory begins a talk about his new book, his ex-girlfriend Candace arrives. She flusters him so much that he has a panic attack and is unable to continue. While recovering, Gregory begs his friend Henry not to let him go home with Candace, but leaves with her the moment she offers. Back at Gregory's place, Candace leaves immediately after they have sex. She is still with her new boyfriend, but wanted to bolster her ego because he was cheating on her.

Left in a state of frustration and rejection, Gregory places a personal ad that reads, "Columbia University professor (male) seeks woman interested in common goals and companionship. Must have Ph.D. and be over thirty-five. Physical appearance not important!" Claire secretly responds to the ad for Rose, and that night, after visiting one of Rose's classes, Gregory asks her out to dinner. They begin a relationship akin to dating, but without any physical intimacy beyond an occasional hug.

Three months later, Gregory proposes. He emphasizes that their relationship will be built on common interests and mutual affection, not sex. However, he does agree to occasional sex, provided Rose gives him enough warning. Gregory and Rose marry in a courthouse ceremony. The relationship continues to grow and become more emotionally intimate, with hints of physical attraction.

While discussing Gregory's European book tour at breakfast, Rose asks him if now is enough warning to tell him she would like to have sex that night, to which he nervously agrees. That night, as she attempts to seduce him, they end up making out passionately on the floor, until Gregory becomes uncomfortable at his loss of control and pulls away. Gregory expresses disappointment in Rose for breaking their agreement, accusing her of "female manipulation". Devastated by the perceived rejection of her attractiveness, she locks herself in the bathroom and breaks down in tears. Later, while Gregory is asleep, Rose sneaks out and goes to her mother's.

During Rose's stay with Hannah, Rose blames her mother for making her feel unattractive as a child. In response, Hannah produces a photo of her as a toddler, describing how pretty she was and revealing that her father adored her and had never held a baby until she came along. This greatly changes Rose's view of herself. Deciding to undergo a makeover, Rose changes her diet, exercises, has her hair restyled, and starts wearing form-fitting clothing and more flattering makeup. Meanwhile, missing Rose, Gregory cuts his European book tour short and returns home. However, when he voices his disapproval of Rose's new appearance, she declares she is no longer in love with him, nor wants to be married to him, and moves back in with her mother.

When Alex discovers Claire's affair with her masseur, they separate. Rose comforts him and they nearly have sex, but she realizes the fantasy of Alex is better than the reality. Gregory starts lashing out at his students, distraught about his failing marriage. He ends up on Henry's couch an emotional and physical wreck, insisting he loves Rose and does not know what to do. Henry encourages him to fight for her.

Before sunrise, Gregory goes to Rose's apartment. He tells Rose he loves her and insists that the night she tried to initiate sex, he only pulled away because of how desperately he wanted her. They kiss, mutually confessing their love as Puccini plays on a neighbor's turntable. When Gregory says he wants to be married to her, she reminds him they are still married. As the sun comes up, they catch a taxi home.

== Cast ==
- Barbra Streisand as Rose Morgan
- Jeff Bridges as Gregory Larkin
- Lauren Bacall as Hannah Morgan
- George Segal as Henry Fine
- Mimi Rogers as Claire Morgan
- Pierce Brosnan as Alex
- Brenda Vaccaro as Doris
- Austin Pendleton as Barry Neufeld
- Elle Macpherson as Candace
- Leslie Stefanson as Sara Myers
- Taina Elg as a professor
- Andrew Parks as Jimmy, the waiter
- Adam LeFevre as the doorman
- Milla Jovovich as girl in commercial (uncredited)
- Allelon Ruggiero as a literature student (uncredited)
- Eli Roth as a literature student (uncredited)

== Production ==
Barbra Streisand initially asked other directors to direct the film, including Robert Zemeckis and Herbert Ross, but they all turned it down possibly due to Streisand having a reputation for being difficult to work with; she ultimately decided to direct the film by herself instead. The film had a troubled production, with filming delays and more than a dozen cast or crew members fired or leaving the production. Notably, Dudley Moore was fired in early November after failing to remember his lines, which was later found to be due to the onset of the progressive brain disorder progressive supranuclear palsy (PSP), a condition that eventually led to his death. He was replaced by George Segal, while cinematographer Dante Spinotti and film editor Alan Heim dropped out on their own.

== Reception ==
=== Box office ===
The film grossed $41 million in the United States and Canada.

=== Critical response ===
On the review aggregator website Rotten Tomatoes, the film holds an approval rating of 51% based on 35 reviews, with an average rating of 5.7/10.

In her review in The New York Times, Janet Maslin called the film's first hour "light and amusing" but added, "then [Barbra Streisand] impresses her audience with good will hubris that goes through the roof. Beguiling as she can be in ugly duckling roles, she becomes insufferable as this story's gloating swan ... The overkill of The Mirror Has Two Faces is partly offset by Ms. Streisand's genuine diva appeal. The camera does love her, even with a gun to its head. And she's able to wring sympathy and humor from the first half of this role. The film also has a big asset in Ms. Bacall . . [who delivers] her lines with trademark tart panache ... and cuts an elegant and sardonic figure".

Roger Ebert of the Chicago Sun-Times said the film "approaches the subject of marriage warily and with wit, like a George Bernard Shaw play ... it's rare to find a film that deals intelligently with issues of sex and love, instead of just assuming that everyone on the screen and in the audience shares the same popular culture assumptions. It's rare, too, to find such verbal characters in a movie, and listening to them talk is one of the pleasures of The Mirror Has Two Faces ... this is a moving and challenging movie".

In the San Francisco Chronicle, Edward Guthmann described the film as "a silly affirmation fantasy ... that Streisand ... uses to prove she's really beautiful, funny and worthy of being loved, gosh darn it ... hasn't she returned to the theme of Homely Girl Redeemed, and crowned herself the victor, countless times? Look back and you'll see that Streisand's career, from the beginning, was one long battle cry for geeks and wallflowers and Jewish girls with big noses - a series of wish-fulfillment scenarios in which she, the perennial underdog, triumphs by dint of talent, chutzpah and a really great personality ... in its first half The Mirror is a romantic-comic delight: nicely directed ... well-acted by a terrific cast and peppered with great one-liners ... by the second half ... the movie has disintegrated into a humorless, drawn-out plea for reassurance".

Todd McCarthy of Variety called it "a vanity production of the first order. A staggeringly obsessive expression of the importance of appearances, good looks and being adored, Barbra Streisand's third directorial outing is also, incidentally, a very old-fashioned wish-fulfillment romantic comedy that has been directed and performed in the broadest possible manner ... From the beginning, it is clear that Streisand intends to hit every point squarely on the head and maybe bang it a few extra times for good measure. Every gag, every line and every emotional cue is pitched to the top balcony so no one will miss a thing, and there are quite a few moments of self-examination and discovery where one nearly expects the star to break into song to underline what she is really feeling ... the subject of the director's uninterrupted gaze. Lit and posed in an old-time movie star way you rarely see anymore, she plays out her career-long is-she-or-isn't-she-beautiful comic psychodrama one more time, with the girlish uncertainties wiped out with the speed of a costume change. If one were to take it all seriously, one would have to point out that there just isn't that much difference in Rose Before and After, that Streisand hasn't allowed herself to look unappealing enough to justify the big change. No matter. The narcissism on display is astonishing to behold, and veteran Barbra worshipers will have a field day. Beyond that, pic does deliver a number of laughs, deep-dish luxury on the production side and an engagingly enthusiastic performance from Bridges".

Lisa Schwarzbaum of Entertainment Weekly rated the film C− and added, "We know these two people are lonely and afraid of love and deserve our empathy. But they enact their tightly choreographed pas de deux in such a hermetically sealed universe that our emotions can never be engaged. Instead, we are left to muse, 'Oy vey, does Streisand know how over-the-top she is?' That's not to say that Mirror is difficult to sit through. The synthetic one-liners that pass for humor and sentiment ... are struck regularly, like gongs ... The settings are pretty. The music is slick".

In The Washington Post, Rita Kempley called the film "Barbra Streisand's latest folly" and added, "Although meant to be a bubbly romantic comedy, the movie is actually a very public tragedy for Streisand, who still can't quite believe that she's not Michelle Pfeiffer ... at 54, it's time to get over girlish hang-ups, forget the noble schnoz and thank God that unlike Cher, you're still recognizable".

In the newspaper's Weekend section, Desson Howe opined, "For Streisand fans, this ugly-duckling parable ... is going to be the perfect experience. But for those who make crucifix signs with their fingers when her name is mentioned, this is definitely one to miss ... the running time is hardly helped by a plethora of strategically framed shots of Rose's legs, new hairstyle, luscious lips and misty-blue eyes, after she has undergone a physical makeover. There is comic relief, however, from Lauren Bacall as Hannah, Rose's egocentric, materialistic mother. Her withering lines ... counteract some of the ubiquitous narcissism".

Lauren Bacall's performance garnered widespread critical acclaim, earning her the Golden Globe Award for Best Supporting Actress – Motion Picture and the Screen Actors Guild Award for Outstanding Performance by a Female Actor in a Supporting Role, in addition to a nomination for the Academy Award for Best Supporting Actress, the first in her then-50-plus-year career.

=== Accolades ===
Award	Category	Recipient(s)	Result	Ref.
Academy Awards	Best Supporting Actress	Lauren Bacall	Nominated	
Academy Awards	Best Original Song	"I Finally Found Someone"; Music and lyrics by Barbra Streisand, Marvin Hamlisch, Bryan Adams, and Robert John "Mutt" Lange	Nominated	
American Comedy Awards	Funniest Supporting Actress in a Motion Picture	Lauren Bacall	Nominated	
ASCAP Film and Television Music Awards	Most Performed Songs from Motion Pictures	"I Finally Found Someone"; Music and lyrics by Barbra Streisand, Marvin Hamlisch, Bryan Adams, and Robert John "Mutt" Lange	Won	
British Academy Film Awards	Best Actress in a Supporting Role	Lauren Bacall	Nominated	
Golden Globe Awards	Best Actress in a Motion Picture – Musical or Comedy	Barbra Streisand	Nominated	
Golden Globe Awards	Best Supporting Actress – Motion Picture	Lauren Bacall	Won	
Golden Globe Awards	Best Original Score – Motion Picture	Marvin Hamlisch	Nominated	
Golden Globe Awards	Best Original Song – Motion Picture	"I Finally Found Someone"; Music and lyrics by Barbra Streisand, Marvin Hamlisch, Bryan Adams, and Robert John "Mutt" Lange	Nominated	
Online Film & Television Association Awards	Best Supporting Actress	Lauren Bacall	Nominated	
Online Film & Television Association Awards	Best Original Song	"I Finally Found Someone"; Music and lyrics by Barbra Streisand, Marvin Hamlisch, Bryan Adams, and Robert John "Mutt" Lange	Nominated	
San Diego Film Critics Society Awards	Best Supporting Actress	Lauren Bacall	Won	
Screen Actors Guild Awards	Outstanding Performance by a Female Actor in a Supporting Role	Lauren Bacall	Won	
Satellite Awards	Best Supporting Actress in a Motion Picture – Musical or Comedy	Lauren Bacall	Nominated	

== Soundtrack ==
Original music for the film was composed by Marvin Hamlisch. It received a nomination for Best Original Score at the 54th Golden Globe Awards. On November 12, 1996, Sony released the soundtrack on CD.

Tracks include "Try a Little Tenderness" by David Sanborn, "The Power Inside of Me" by Richard Marx, "I Finally Found Someone" by Streisand and Bryan Adams, "All of My Life" by Streisand and "The Apology / Nessun Dorma" by Luciano Pavarotti with the London Philharmonic Orchestra conducted by Zubin Mehta. In the final scene, Pavarotti's voice was mimed by real-life tenor and actor Carlo Scibelli.

The CD single for "I Finally Found Someone" also contains the Spanish-language version of Streisand's "Evergreen": "Siempre Verde (Tema de Amor de Nace Una Estrella)".

== See also ==
- List of films about mathematicians
