= Duke Farms =

Estate and nature reserve in Hillsborough, New Jersey, United States

- Raritan Valley Farm
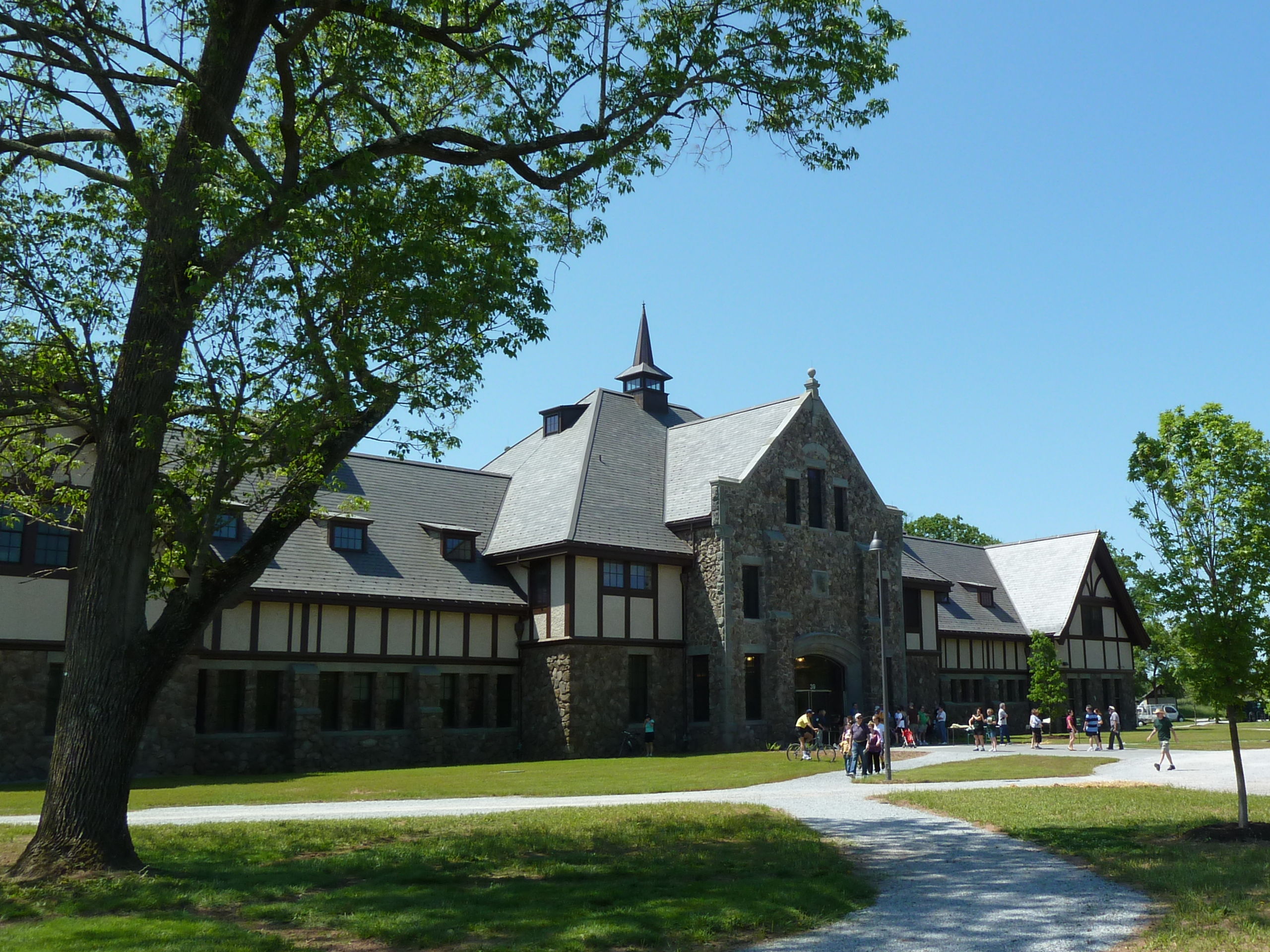
- The Farm Barn building, now the Orientation Center

- Location within Somerset County, New Jersey
- Type: Nature reserve, park
- Location: Hillsborough, New Jersey
- Coordinates: 40.544852°N 74.624059°W
- Area: 2,700 acres (1,100 ha) (total); 943 acres (382 ha) (open to public)
- Elevation: 98 feet (30 m)
- Opened: Raritan Valley Farm: 1893; Duke Farms: 1899; Duke Farms & Gardens: 2012
- Closed: Raritan Valley Farm: 1899; Duke Farms: 1915
- Founder: James Buchanan Duke
- Designer: J.B. Duke; Doris Duke
- Operator: Doris Duke Charitable Foundation
- Open: Nov 1–Mar31: 8:30am–4:30pm Apr 1–Oct 31: 8:30am–6:00pm Closed Sundays and Mondays. Saturday visitation requires reservation of a free entry pass.
- Status: Operational
- Plants: see Duke Gardens for details
- Parking: 365 spots
- Website: dukefarms.org

Duke Farms previously served as an estate that was established by James Buchanan Duke, an American entrepreneur who founded Duke Power and the American Tobacco Company, and owned by his daughter, Doris Duke. Located in Hillsborough, New Jersey, the property is operated and managed by the Doris Duke Foundation after the death of Doris Duke, James B. Duke's daughter and the second owner. After extensive reorganization, Duke Farms was opened to the public on May 19, 2012.

== History ==
Starting in 1893, "Buck" Duke started to buy land next to the Raritan River in rural New Jersey. His vision was to create a farm similar to those in North Carolina where he had grown up. He engaged a number of architects and engineers to fulfill his dream, including Buckenham & Miller, James Leal Greenleaf and Ellen Biddle Shipman. Eventually he had assembled about 2,700 acres (11 km^{2}) of farm and wood lands that contained 45 buildings, 9 lakes, 18 miles of roads, 810 acres of woodlands, 464 acres of grassland bird habitat and 1.5 miles of stone walls.

Duke died in 1925, and his 12-year-old daughter, Doris Duke, gained control of the property after suing her mother, who had wanted to sell it. She restored it and moved in at the age of fifteen. She was very invested in the property and made it her main residence. She incorporated innovative ecological farming methods she learned from Louis Bromfield's Malabar Farm. Starting in 1958 she created and designed over a five-year period a unique botanical display in the Horace Trumbauer conservatory and greenhouses known as Duke Gardens. Duke Gardens opened to the public in 1964. Doris Duke died in 1993.

== As park for the public ==
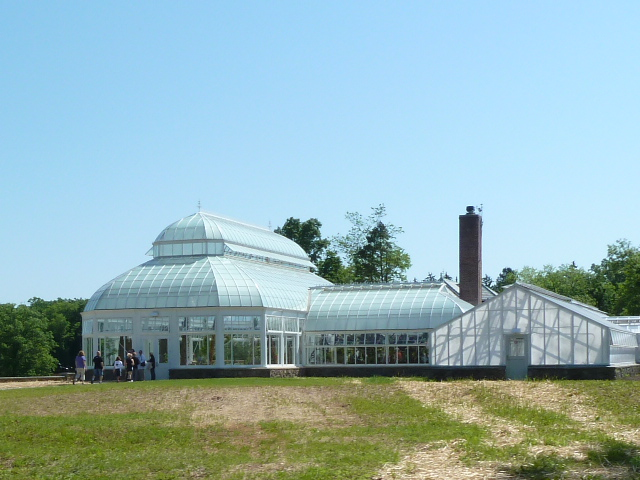
The Orchid Range

Duke Farms is a center of the Doris Duke Foundation. A decision was made to renovate the estate as "a model of environmental stewardship in the 21st Century and (to) inspire visitors to become informed stewards of the land." While reorganizing the estate, little was accessible to the public. In 2008, DF created some controversy when it permanently closed Duke Gardens, demolishing the indoor display gardens that had been created by Doris Duke. Over the years, the DF created new indoor and outdoor display gardens that are eco-friendly, use native plants, and are wheelchair accessible. In the process of rehabilitation, numerous invasive foreign plants were removed, including Norwegian maple and Asian Ailanthus, and replaced by native species. The property has a number of notable trees, including four of the ten oldest trees of New Jersey, and two champion trees, a Northern Red Oak and an Amur Cork Tree. On May 19, 2012, Duke Farms opened to the public. After a $45-million renovation, Duke Farms now serves as an environmental center that "aims to inspire people to become guardians of the planet, and to be a free, inclusive, accessible resource for helping everyone find their place in nature." Duke Farms' restored habitats now include 30 endangered species and 230 varieties of birds, among which are the great blue heron and the bald eagle.

In 2016, the mansion where Doris Duke lived was demolished in order to open up the north side of the property. This opened up access to the Borough of Raritan and Raritan Greenway trails.

== Gallery ==
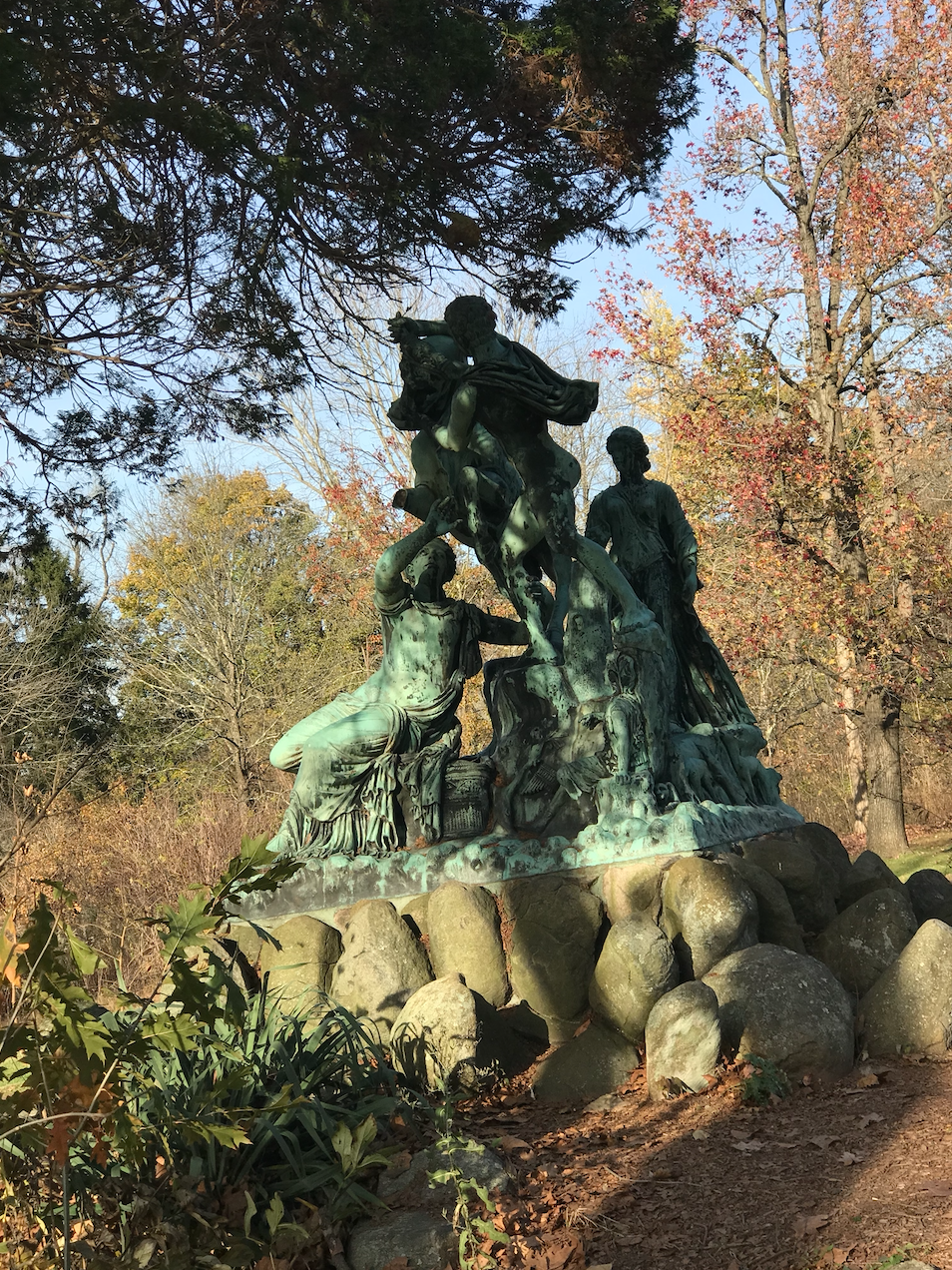

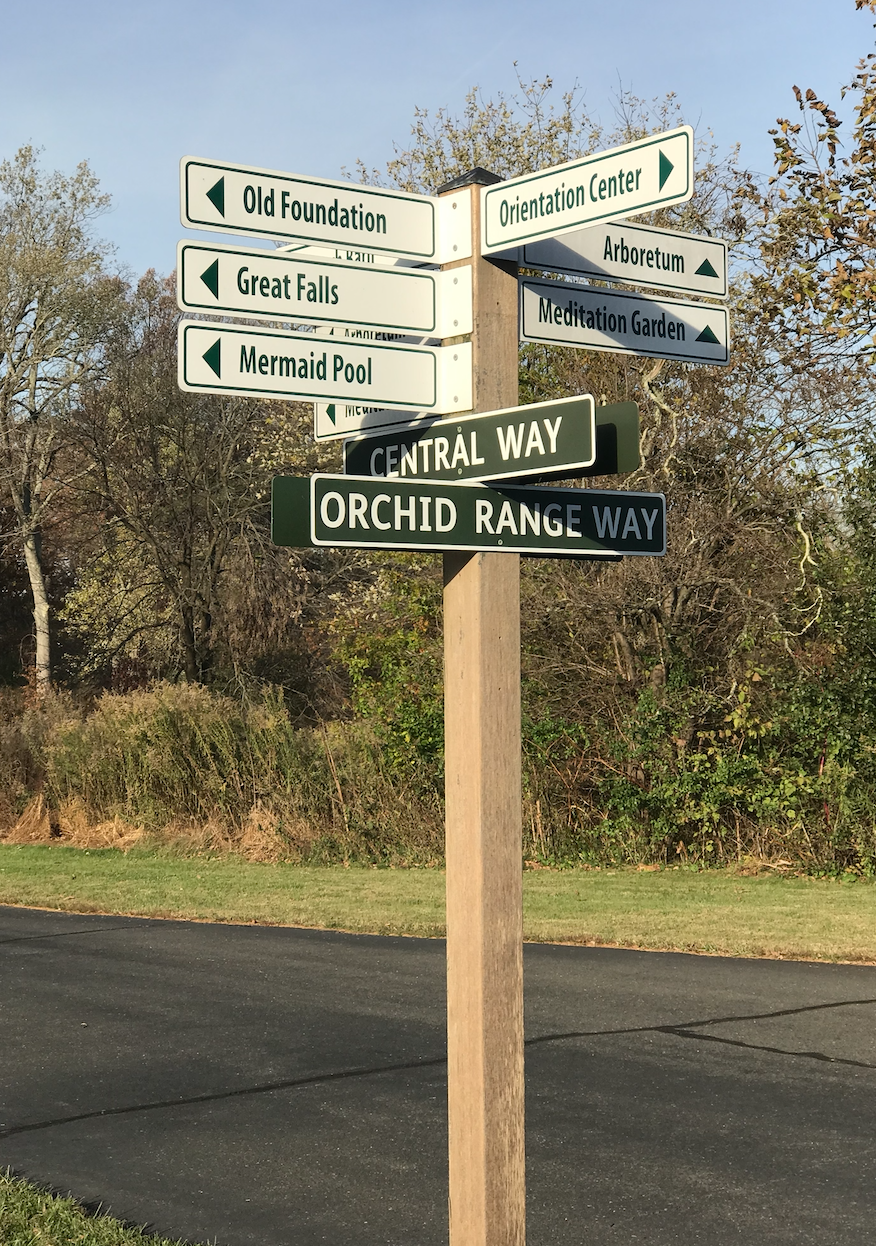

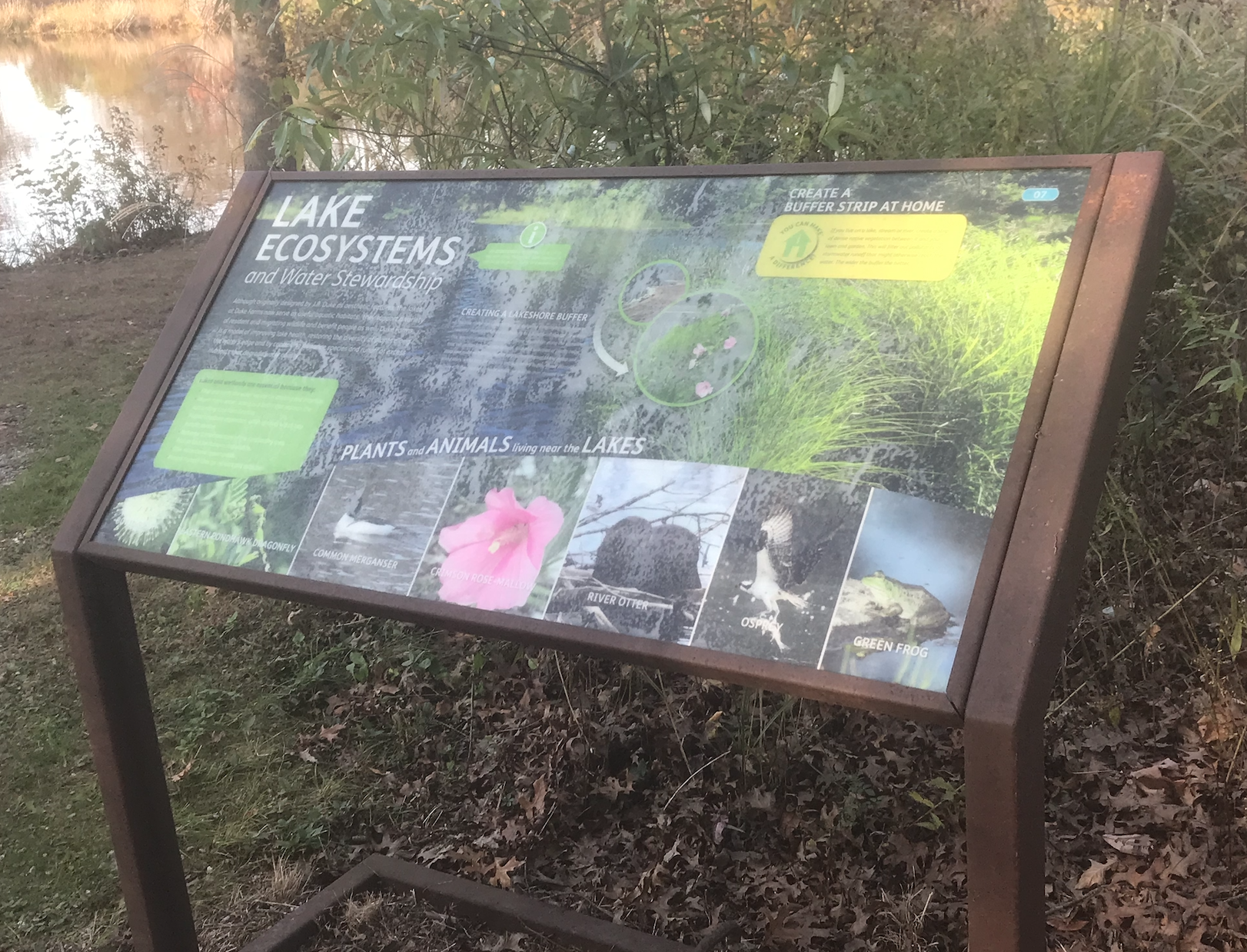

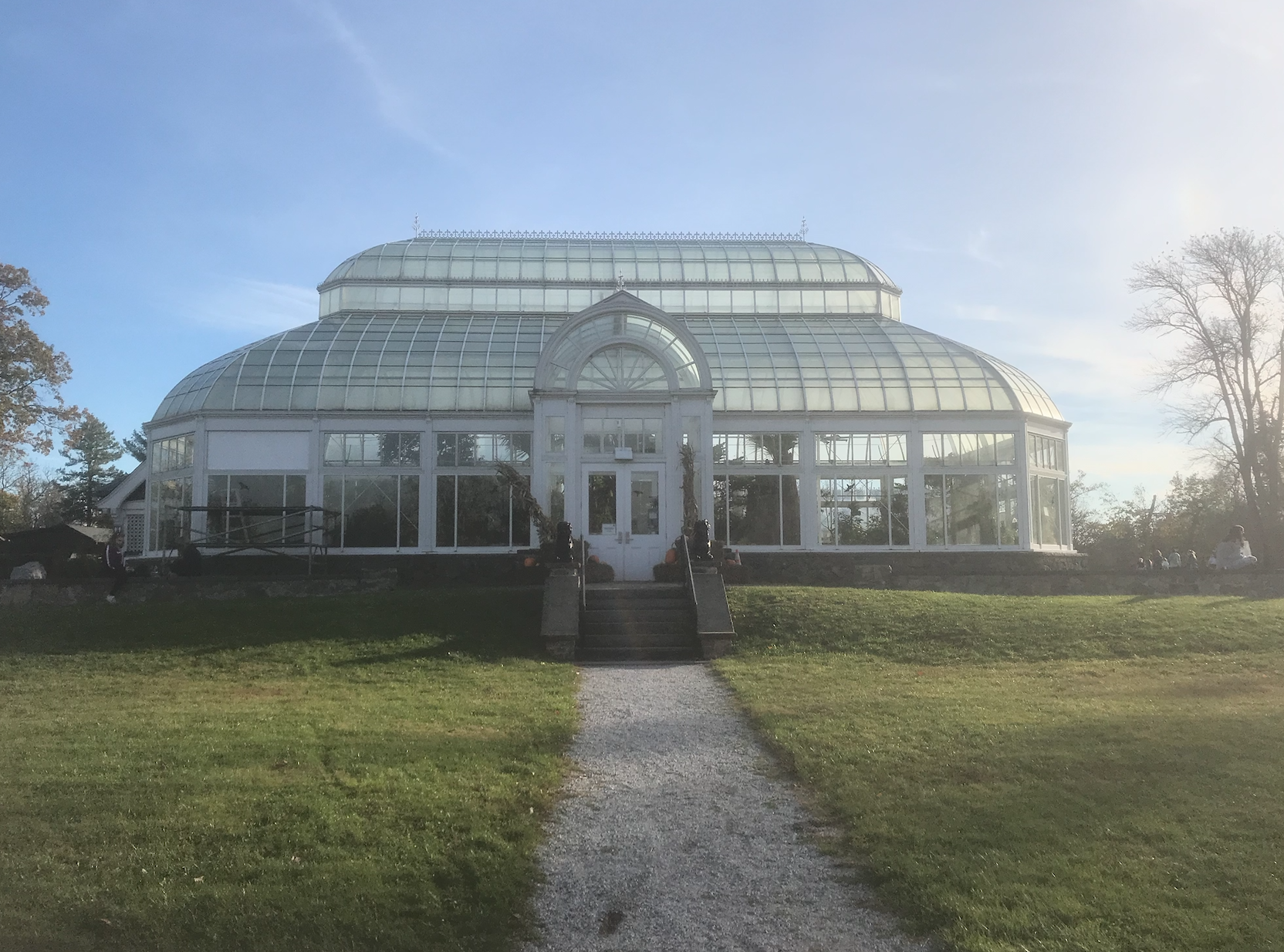

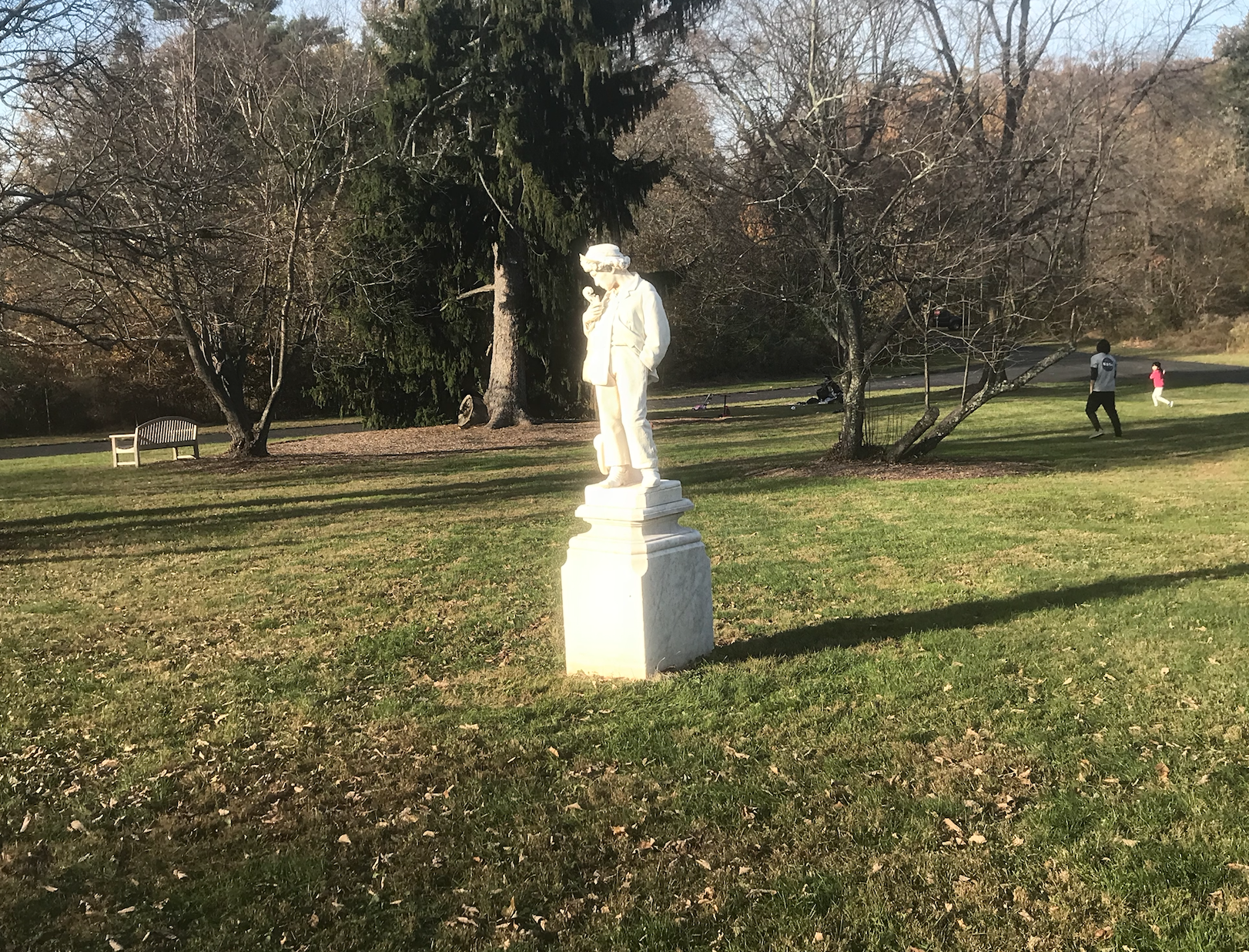

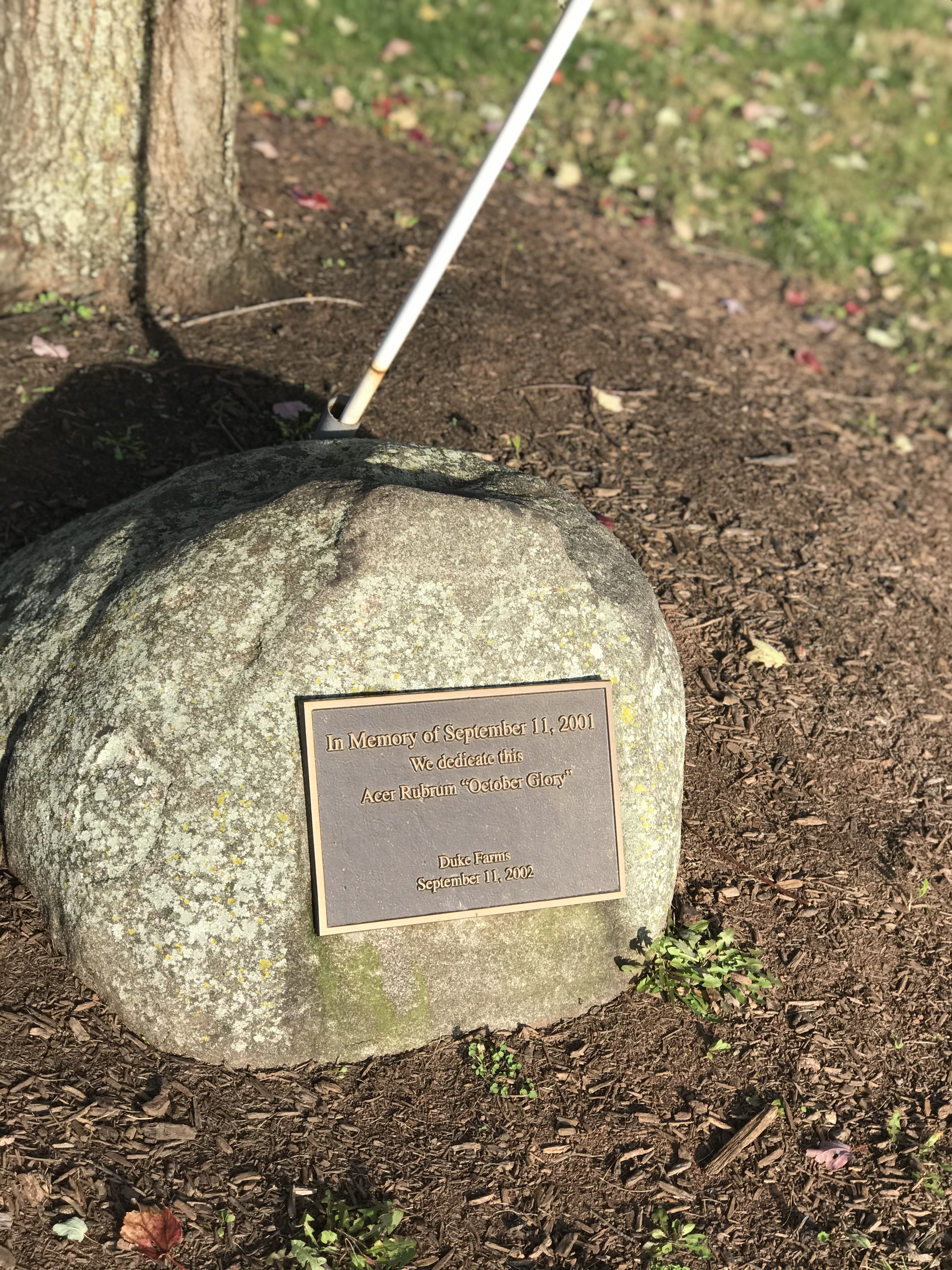

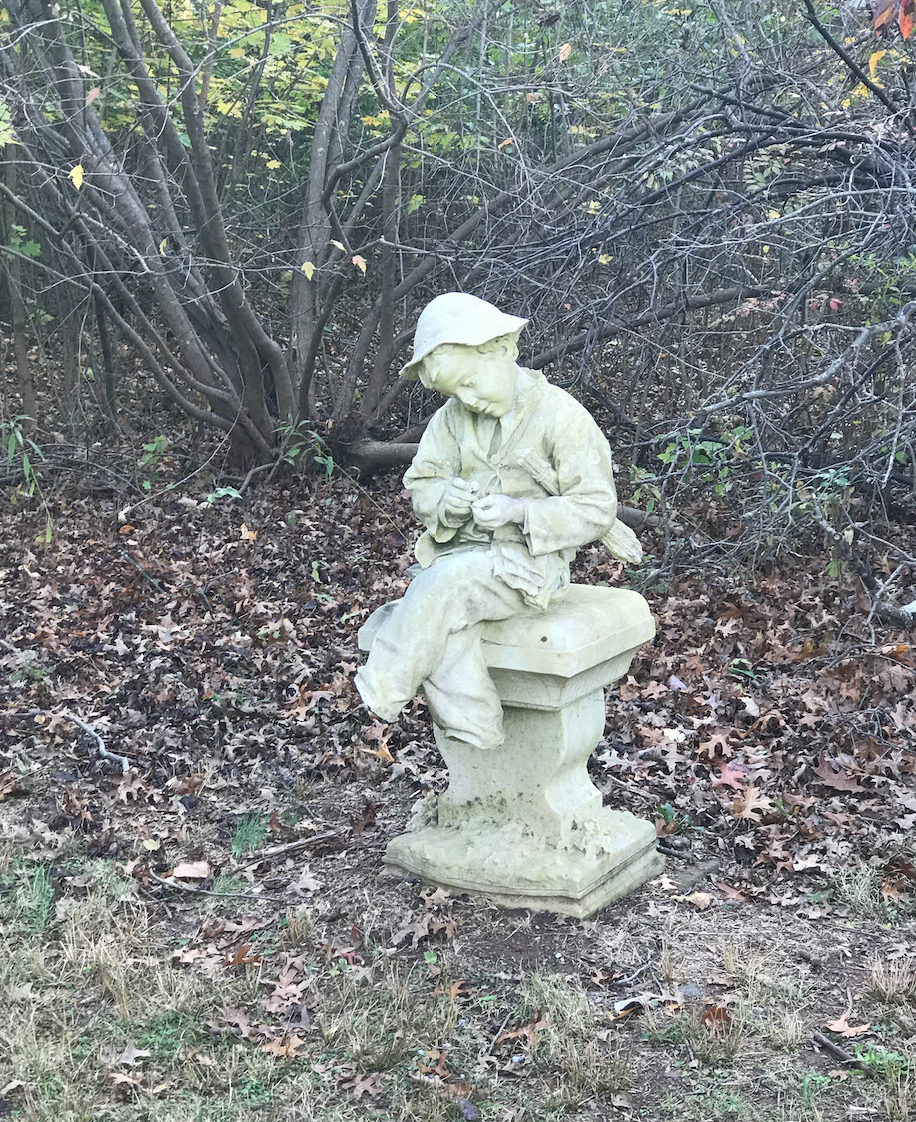

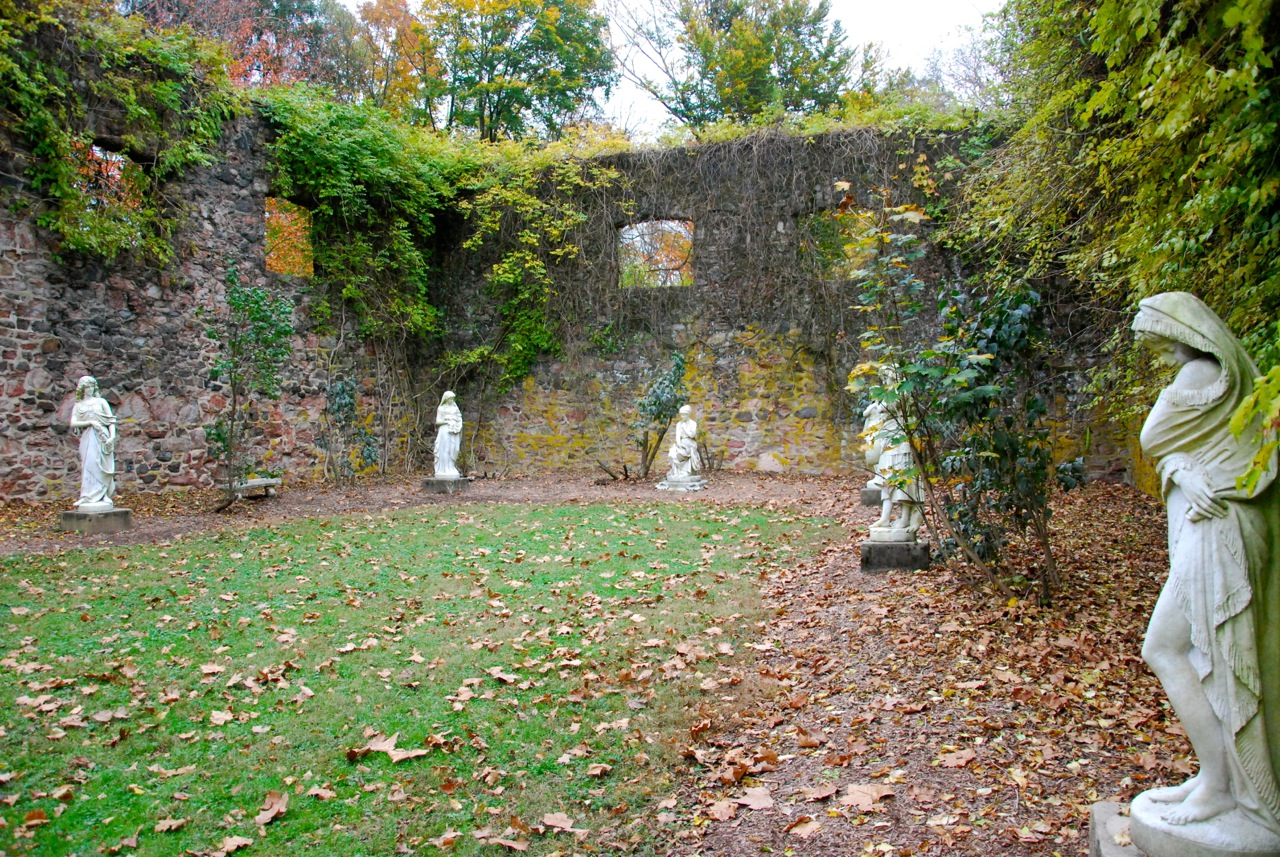

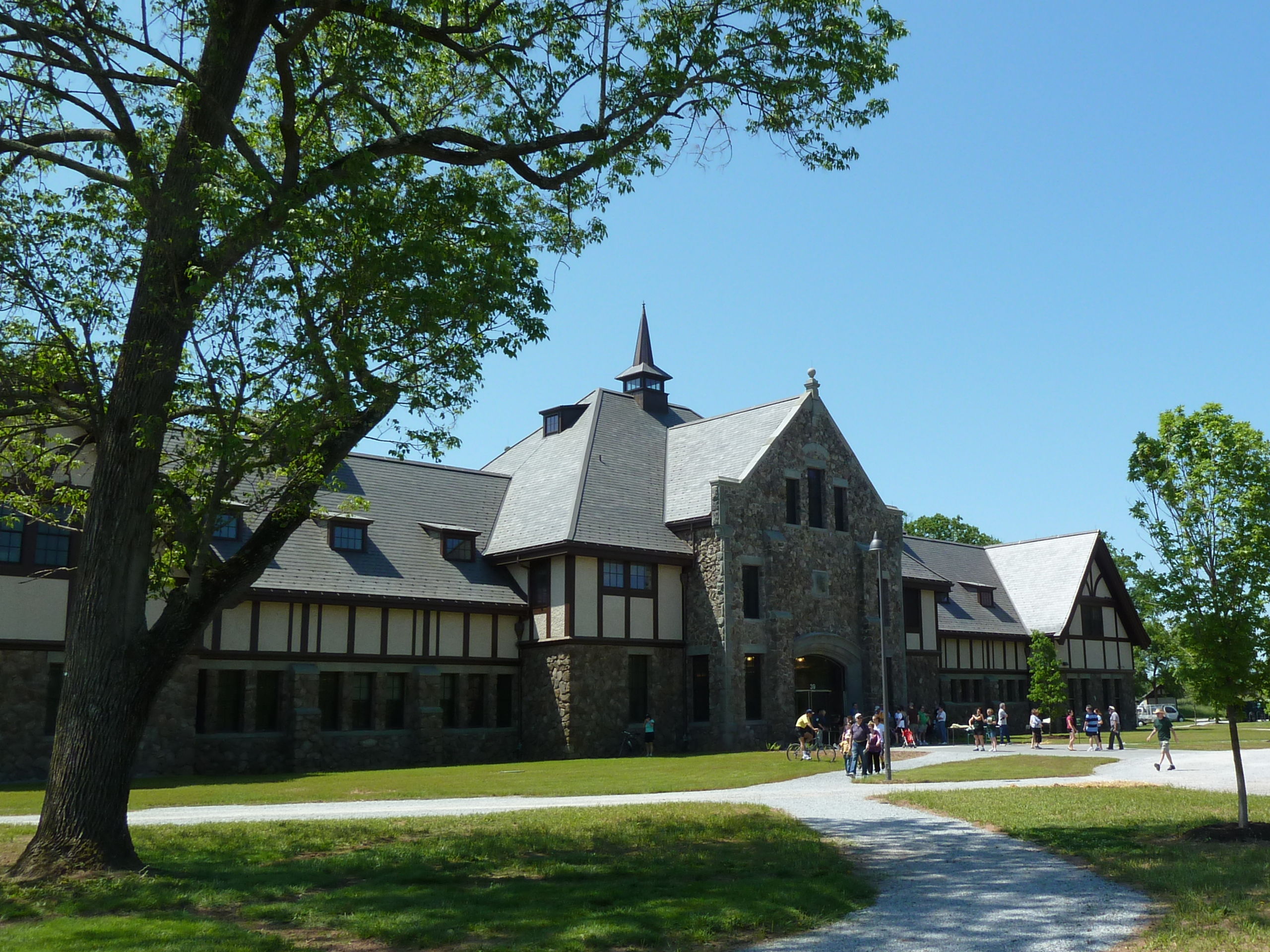

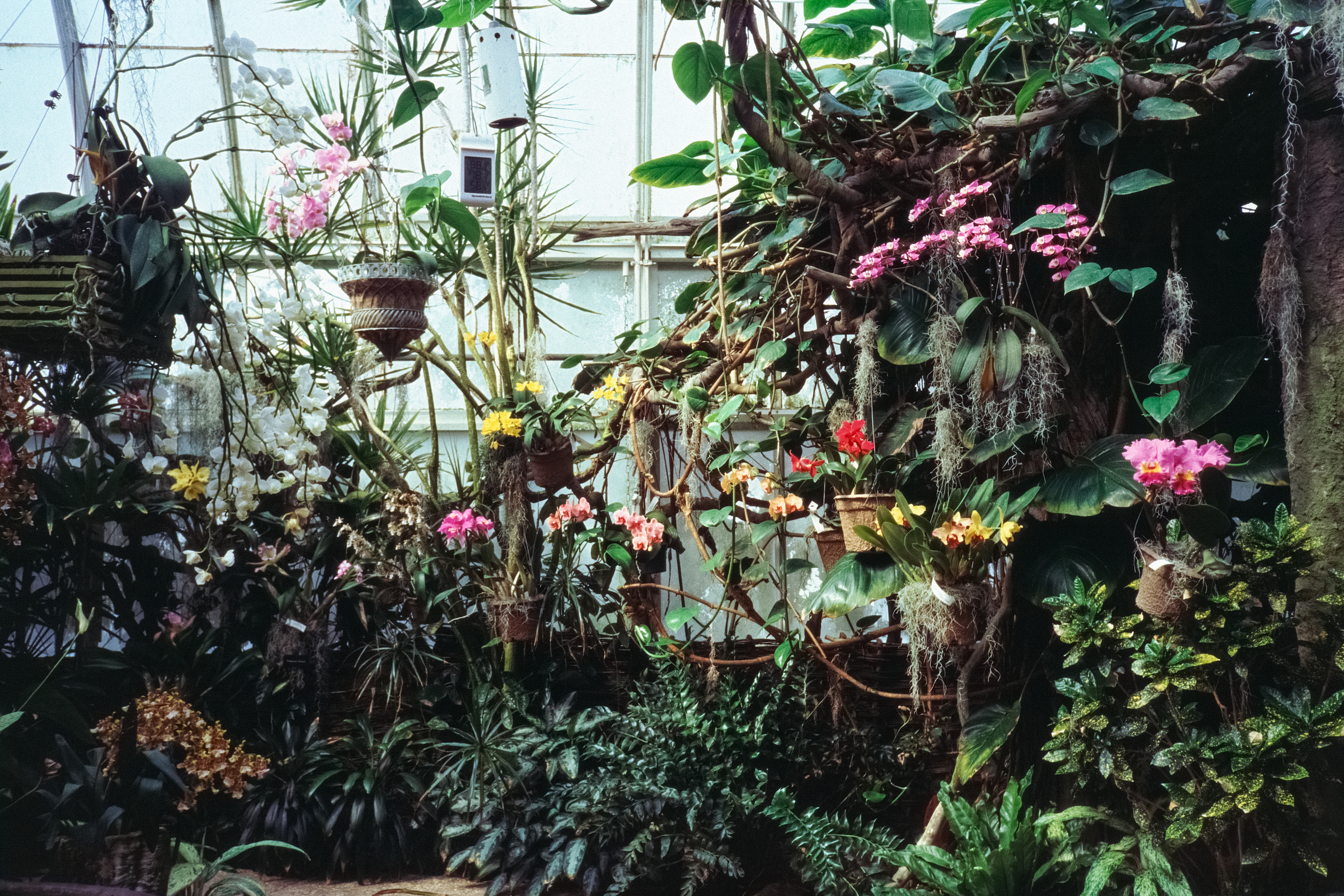

== See also ==
- Rough Point
- Shangri La (Doris Duke)
- Falcon's Lair
