= Ruggles Avenue Surf Break =

Ruggles Avenue Surf Break is a surf break in Newport, Rhode Island. The rocky reef break features three distinct breaks: "The Point" "Out Front" and "Around the Corner", each of which presents different challenges, and becomes active during different weather patterns.

== History ==
In 1971, East Coast surf pioneer Sid Abbruzzi was arrested at Ruggles for violating a local city ordinance which prohibited surfing. He was fined $10, but appealed the case to the Rhode Island Supreme Court, where his conviction was thrown out. This secured a victory for surfers and waterfront access advocates.

== Controversy ==
In March 2013, the Rhode Island Department of Transportation ("RIDOT") petitioned the state Coastal Resources Management Council for permission to make repairs to Newport Cliff Walk necessitated by damage sustained to it by Hurricane Sandy. RIDOT sought to reinforce the cliffwalk using armor stone in such a way that the surf break could become compromised. In addition, the construction application includes a request to add two temporary 200"x40" stone jetties which would bisect the breaks across the prevailing wave structure.

In response to the proposal, environmental activists joined the surf community to object to portions of the reconstruction proposal citing the impact to surfers as well as the negative impact to aquatic species. A formal decision is expected in May 2013. http://www.surfline.com/surf-news/ruggles-rally_94814/
