= Falcon Lair =

Estate in Benedict Canyon, Los Angeles, United States

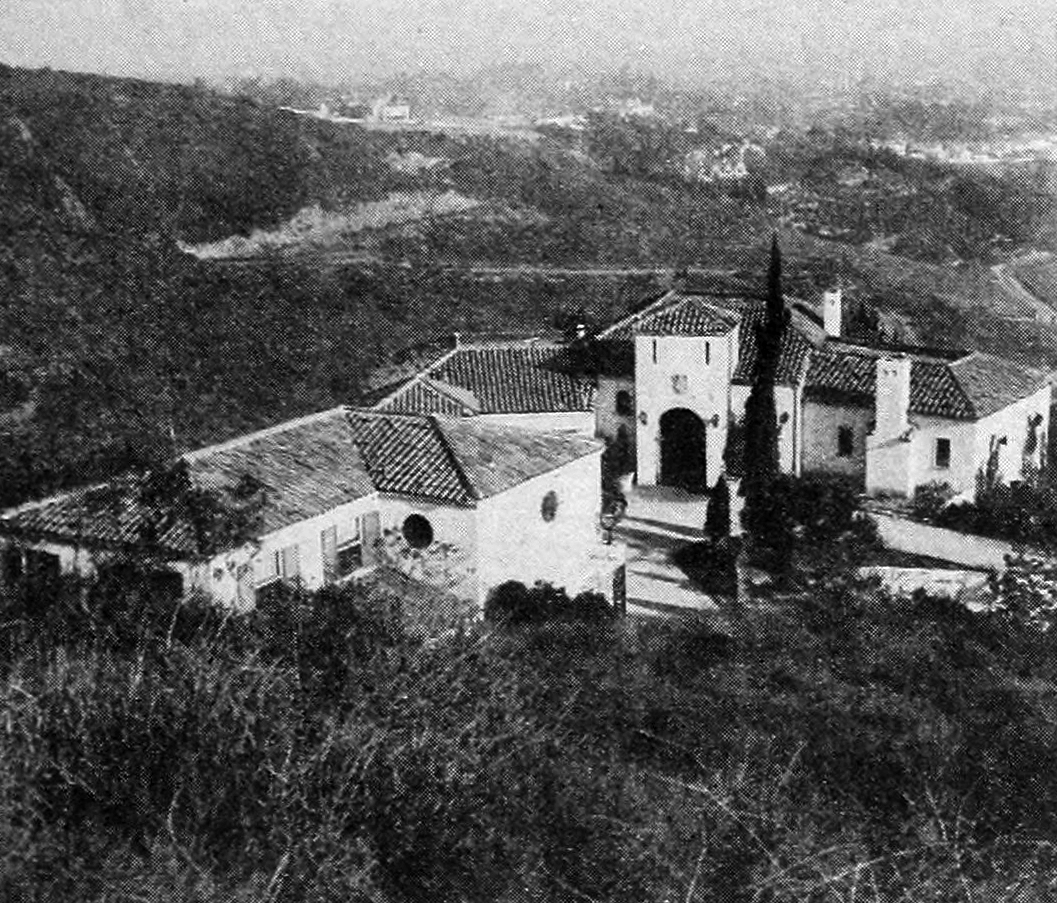
- Aerial view, 1930

- Location within the Los Angeles metropolitan area

General information
- Type: House
- Architectural style: Spanish Colonial Revival
- Location: 1436 Bella Drive, Benedict Canyon, Los Angeles, California, U.S.
- Coordinates: 34.09593°N 118.43227°W
- Construction started: 1924
- Demolished: 2006

Technical details
- Floor area: 4,700 sq ft (440 m^{2})

Design and construction
- Architect: Wallace Neff

Falcon Lair (also known as Falcon's Lair) was an estate above Benedict Canyon in Los Angeles, California. The Spanish Revival house, designed by Wallace Neff, was originally built by Beverly Hills-based real estate developer George Read for the silent film actor Rudolph Valentino, who purchased and dubbed it "Falcon Lair" in honor of The Hooded Falcon, a never-completed film the actor tried to produce with his wife Natacha Rambova. Valentino bought the 4-acre (1.6 ha) estate in 1925 for $175,000 (equivalent to $3,213,000 in 2025). He filled the house with antiques, imported European furnishings, and memorabilia from his travels. Shortly after the purchase, Valentino and Rambova divorced. He retained Falcon Lair, hosted extravagant parties, and kept horses in his stable. After Valentino's sudden death from peritonitis in 1926, the estate was auctioned off to settle his debts.

After a succession of different owners, Falcon Lair was purchased by billionaire tobacco heiress Doris Duke in 1965, who lived there until her death in 1993. The Duke estate sold the house in 1998 for $2,294,000, and in 2003, the new owners began an extensive restoration and renovation project to bring the mansion back to its original grandeur. However, construction was halted and the estate was put on the market shortly thereafter. It was purchased in 2006 and ultimately demolished.

== Rudolph Valentino ==
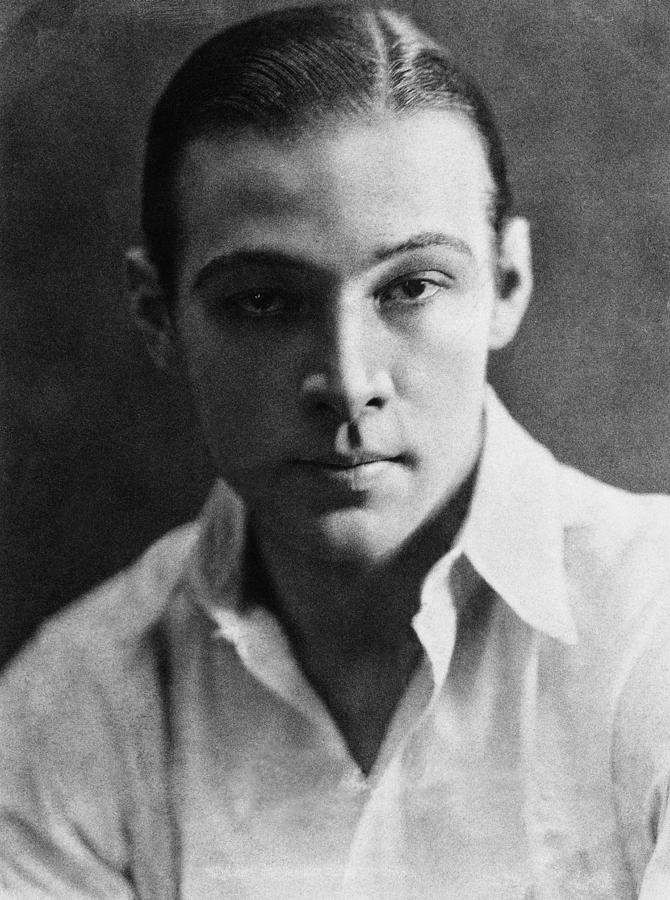
Rudolph Valentino, original owner of Falcon Lair

During the time that silent film actor Rudolph Valentino lived there, the 4700-square foot, two-level Falcon Lair boasted over 8 acres of land, 16 rooms, three master bedrooms, three baths, several fireplaces, a library, a detached four-car garage complete with a 120-gallon gasoline pump and upstairs four-bedroom servants' quarters, a horse stable where Valentino kept his four Arabian horses, and extensive gardens filled with imported Italian trees. Upon moving in, the movie star also had to construct a 9-foot cement wall surrounding the perimeter of the estate in order to keep out his more aggressive fans, who would often try to sneak onto the property.

=== Reputation as haunted ===
In an Associated Press interview in Beverly Hills, California on March 31, 1930, actor Harry Carey recounted his experience during a brief stay at Falcon Lair. The story was picked up by a local newspaper, The Evening Outlook, that served several communities in and around the Los Angeles Westside.

The ghosts have been routed from filmland's most famous haunted house. No more will the spirit of Rudolph Valentino stalk through the spacious rooms of Falcon Lair, the palatial mansion he once occupied on a terrace overlooking Beverly Hills. No more will pale lights, weird moaning and sinister whispering flash and echo through the castle chambers where once the sheik held sway. Harry Carey, screen actor, knew all about the spooks who were supposed to inhabit Falcon Lair, but upon his recent return from location in Africa, he had to find some place for Mrs. Carey and their two children, and the Valentino estate was made to order. Over the protest of friends, he moved his family into Falcon Lair and his horses into the roomy Valentino stables. "Africa was wild," Carey said, "but our first night in Falcon Lair was one to turn your hair gray. Next morning we fix the windows and the banging ceased. We traced the howling to the wind blowing through the metal weather boards. We cut back the overgrown trees and shrubbery near the house, and other noises stopped. But night after night the tapping on the walls continued. "One day by chance, I discovered a hidden door that apparently led to a part of the basement. I opened the door and half a hundred bats rushed out; that ended the tapping. But the weird very colored lights that once flashed from the windows!" Exploring the basement through the hidden door, Carey said he found a large box containing a mass of electrical wires and switches. He traced these wires and found a lead up a chimney to a built-in bookcase in the room above. From the bookcase hidden wires ran to other parts of the house. Investigating further, Carey said he learned that shortly after Valentino's death, a caretaker was hired to watch the property. He was a spiritualist, who with his followers held seances in the rooms where electrical terminals were found. During the seances, Carey said he learned that the spirit of Valentino, garbed in sheik raiment, was made to appear. From various electrical connections, pale blue and green mysteriously flashed on and off through the house. "We seem to have solved the mystery," Carey said, "but when our lease is up, we are going back to the wide open spaces of a ranch. Sometimes I wake up and hear new noises; maybe the place IS haunted."

== Doris Duke ==
After several owners, Doris Duke acquired the estate in 1965 to be with her companion, jazz musician Joe Castro, and to mingle with the Hollywood crowd. Falcon Lair became a venue for jazz concerts. Duke befriended Sharon Tate, her Benedict Canyon neighbor. Eventually, she settled on a pattern where she would rotate her residence during the year, staying at Duke Farms in New Jersey and Rough Point in Newport, R.I. during the summer, flying to Falcon Lair on her birthday, November 22 and spending the winter months at Shangri La in Hawaii. In 1993, after hip surgery, knee surgery, and a stroke, Doris Duke was kept in isolation—reportedly in a virtual "prison"—at Falcon Lair until her death.

== Later history ==
Falcon Lair was listed in 1997 for $3.9 million and sold by the Duke estate in 1998 for $2,294,000. A renovation project started in 2003 but was not completed; the property was offered for sale in 2006. The historic main building of the estate was bulldozed that year. In April 2009, the property was on the market for $7.95 million. Remaining at the property were the former stable building and three-bay garage, converted by Duke into a three-bedroom guesthouse and pool pavilion. In 2019 this house on 1.3 acres (0.53 ha) was listed for sale at $4.95 million. The remainder of the original estate was approved for a 30,000-square-foot (2,800 m^{2})-plus house and listed for sale in 2018 at $29.5 million.

== Recordings ==
- 1956: Zoot Sims with The Joe Castro Trio Live at Falcon Lair (Pablo Records) Don Joham a regular at Falcon Lair (The Lighthouse Hermosa Beach)
- 1959: Teddy Edwards at Falcon's Lair with Joe Castro – split LP with Sonny Rollins' At Music Inn (MetroJazz Records)
