= Doris Duke =

American billionaire (1912–1993)

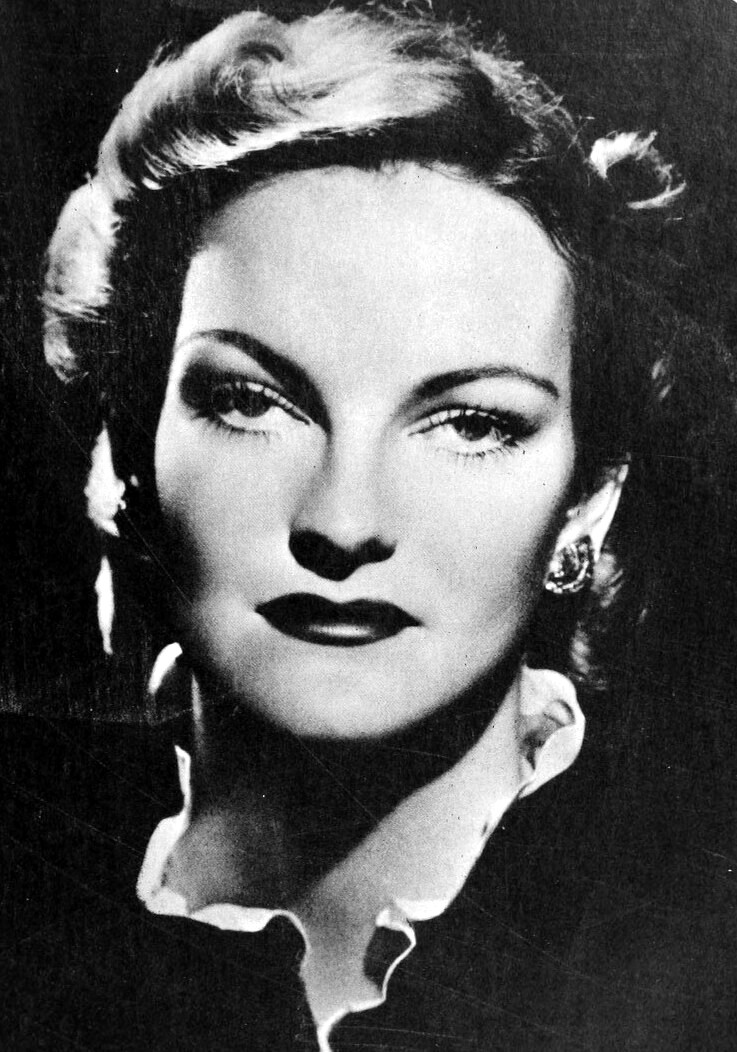
- Duke in 1951
- Born: November 22, 1912; New York City, U.S.
- Died: October 28, 1993 (aged 80); Los Angeles, California, U.S.
- Occupations: Philanthropist; art collector; horticulturalist; socialite
- Spouse(s): James H. R. Cromwell (m. 1935; div. 1943) Porfirio Rubirosa (m. 1947; div. 1951)
- Children: 2
- Father: James Buchanan Duke
- Residences: Falcon Lair (Los Angeles, California, U.S.); Shangri La (Honolulu, Hawaii, U.S.); Duke Farms (Hillsborough Township, New Jersey, U.S.); James B. Duke House (New York City, New York, U.S.); Rough Point (Newport, Rhode Island, U.S.)

Doris Duke (November 22, 1912 – October 28, 1993) was an American billionaire tobacco heiress, philanthropist, and socialite. She was often called "the richest girl in the world". Her great wealth, luxurious lifestyle, and love life attracted significant press coverage, both during her life and after her death.

Duke's passions varied wildly. Briefly a news correspondent in the 1940s, she also played jazz piano and learned to surf competitively. At her father's estate in Hillsborough Township, New Jersey, she created one of the largest indoor botanical displays in the United States. She was also active in preserving more than 80 historic buildings in Newport, Rhode Island. Duke was close friends with former First Lady Jacqueline Kennedy Onassis. In 1968, Duke created the Newport Restoration Foundation, and Kennedy Onassis was appointed the vice president and championed the foundation.

Her philanthropic work in AIDS research, medicine, and child welfare continued into her old age. She also donated funds to support and educate black students in the American South who were disadvantaged because of racism. Her estimated US$1.2 billion (equivalent to $2.4 billion in 2025) fortune was largely left to charity. Duke's legacy is administered by the trustees of the Doris Duke Foundation, dedicated to medical research, prevention of cruelty to children and animals, the performing arts, wildlife, and ecology.

== Early life ==
Duke was born in New York City, the only child of tobacco and hydroelectric power tycoon James Buchanan Duke and his second wife, Nanaline Holt Inman, widow of William Patterson Inman. At his death in 1925, the elder Duke's will bequeathed the majority of his estate to his wife and daughter, along with $17 million in two separate clauses of the will to The Duke Endowment he had created in 1924. The total value of the estate was estimated from $60 - $100 million (equivalent to $1.0 billion to $1.836 billion in 2025), the majority derived from J. B. Duke's holdings in the American Tobacco Company, the precursor of the Duke Power Company.

Duke spent her early childhood at Duke Farms, her father's 2,700-acre (11 km^{2}) estate in Hillsborough Township, New Jersey. Due to ambiguity in James Duke's will, a lawsuit was filed in 1927 to prevent auctions and outright sales of real estate he had owned; in effect, Doris Duke successfully sued her mother and other executors to prevent the sales. One of the pieces of real estate in question was a Manhattan mansion at 1 East 78th Street which later became the home of the Institute of Fine Arts at New York University.

== Adult life ==
When she turned 18, in 1930, the 6 feet 0 inches (1.83 m) tall Duke was presented to society as a debutante, at a ball at Rough Point, the family residence in Newport, Rhode Island. She received large bequests from her father's will when she turned 21, 25, and 30; she was sometimes referred to as the "world's richest girl". Her mother died in 1962, leaving her jewelry, a coat, and an additional $250 million (see below).

When Duke came of age, she used her wealth to pursue a variety of interests, including extensive world travel and the arts. She studied singing with Estelle Liebling, the voice teacher of Beverly Sills, in New York City. During World War II, she worked in a canteen for sailors in Egypt, taking a salary of one dollar a year. She spoke French fluently. In 1945, Duke began a short-lived career as a foreign correspondent for the International News Service, reporting from different cities across the war-ravaged Europe. After the war, she moved to Paris and wrote for the magazine Harper's Bazaar.

While living in Hawaii, Duke became the first non-Hawaiian woman to take up competitive surfing under the tutelage of surfing champion and Olympic swimmer Duke Kahanamoku and his brothers. A lover of animals, in particular her dogs and pet camels, Duke became a wildlife refuge supporter.

Duke's interest in horticulture led to a friendship with Pulitzer Prize-winning author and scientific farmer, Louis Bromfield, who operated Malabar Farm, his country home in Lucas, Ohio in Richland County. Today, his farm is part of Malabar Farm State Park, made possible by a donation from Duke that helped purchase the property after Bromfield's death. A section of woods there is dedicated to her and bears her name.

At age 46, Duke started to create Duke Gardens, an exotic public-display garden, to honor her father James Buchanan Duke. She extended new greenhouses from the Horace Trumbauer conservatory at her home in Duke Farms, New Jersey. Each of the eleven interconnected gardens was a full-scale re-creation of a garden theme, country or period, inspired by DuPont's Longwood Gardens. She designed the architectural, artistic and botanical elements of the displays based on observations from her extensive international travels. She also labored on their installation, sometimes working 16-hour days. Display construction began in 1958.

Duke had learned to play the piano at an early age; she developed a lifelong appreciation of jazz and befriended many jazz musicians. She also liked gospel music and sang in a gospel choir.

Duke cultivated an extensive art collection, principally of Islamic and Southeast Asian art. In 2014, 60 objects from her collection (including ceramics, textiles, paintings, tile panels, and full-scale architectural elements) were displayed temporarily at the University of Michigan Museum of Art in the exhibition "Doris Duke's Shangri La: Architecture, Landscape, and Islamic Art", organized by the Doris Duke Foundation for Islamic Art. The collection is on public display at her former home in Honolulu, Hawaii, now the Doris Duke Foundation for Islamic Art.

=== Homes ===
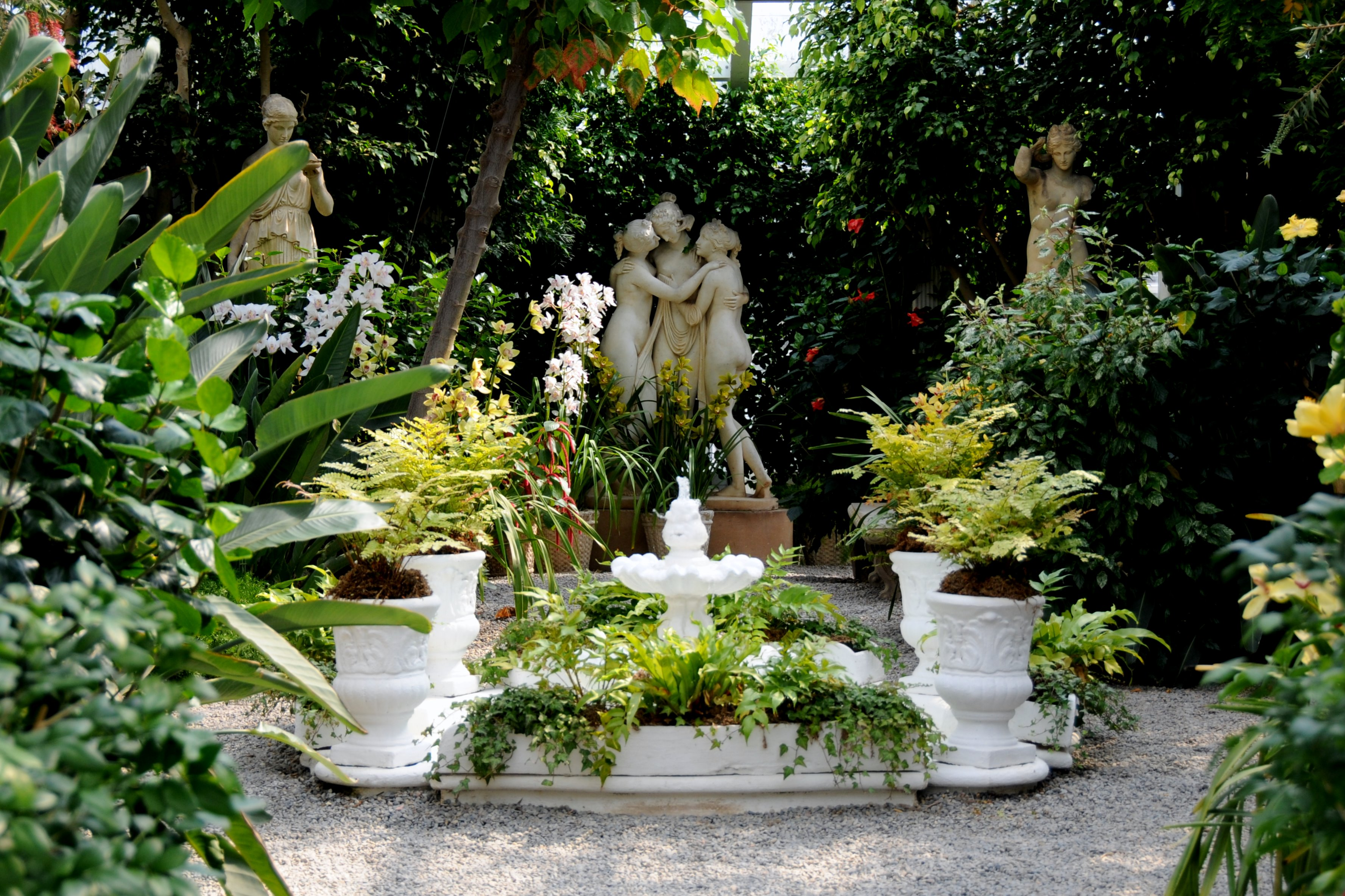
Duke created the Italian Garden to showcase sculptures that her father had collected, such as this replica of Canova's Three Graces

Duke acquired a number of homes; her principal residence and official domicile was Duke Farms, her father's 2,700 acre (11 km^{2}) estate in Hillsborough Township, New Jersey. Here she created Duke Gardens, a 60,000-square-foot (5,600 m^{2}) public indoor botanical display that was among the largest in America.

Duke's other residences were private during her lifetime: she spent summer weekends working on her Newport Restoration Foundation projects while staying at Rough Point, the 49-room English manor-style mansion that she inherited in Newport, Rhode Island.

Winters were spent at an estate she built in the 1930s named "Shangri La" in Honolulu, Hawaii; and at "Falcon Lair" in the Benedict Canyon area of Los Angeles, California, once the home of Rudolph Valentino. She also maintained two apartments in Manhattan: a nine-room penthouse with a 1,000-square-foot (93 m^{2}) veranda at 475 Park Avenue that was later owned by journalist Cindy Adams; and another apartment near Times Square that she used exclusively as an office for the management of her financial affairs.

She purchased her own Boeing 737 and redecorated the interior of the plane to travel between homes and her trips to collect art and plants. The plane included a bedroom decorated to resemble a bedroom in a real house.

Duke was a hands-on homeowner, even climbing a three-story scaffolding to clean tile murals in the courtyard of Shangri La, and working side-by-side with her gardeners at Duke Farms.

Three of Duke's residences are currently managed by subsidiaries of the Doris Duke Foundation and allow limited public access. Duke Farms in New Jersey is managed by the Duke Farms Foundation; a video tour of the former Duke Gardens is available. Rough Point was deeded to the Newport Restoration Foundation in 1999 and opened to the public in 2000. Shangri-La is operated by the Doris Duke Foundation for Islamic Art.

== Death of Eduardo Tirella ==
In 1966, Eduardo Tirella, curator of Duke's art holdings for the previous decade, decided to leave for a career in Hollywood as a production designer. On October 6, he flew to Newport, where Duke was staying at Rough Point, to collect his belongings and let Duke know that he was leaving her employ. His friends (who also knew her) warned him she would not take it well. The next afternoon, the estate's staff overheard the two having a loud and lengthy argument before they got into a rented Dodge Polara to leave.

According to Duke, Tirella, who had been driving, got out at the gate to open it, leaving the engine running but with the parking brake engaged and the transmission in park. Duke said she moved from the passenger seat to the driver's seat to drive the car forward and pick Tirella up once the gate was open. To do so, she released the parking brake and shifted into drive, but instead of putting her foot on the brake pedal, she hit the gas. The vehicle, she told police, pinned Tirella against the still-opening gates, knocked him over, and struck a tree. Tirella was found trapped under the car on Bellevue Avenue and was pronounced dead of serious injuries.

After a brief investigation, the Newport police ruled the death an accident. But a reexamination of the evidence at the scene found it inconsistent with Duke's account. Tirella's family sued Duke for wrongful death and won $75,000. They were initially awarded a larger sum, which was reduced with the aid of Duke's lawyers. In the end $581,000 in today's dollars was divided among Tirella's eight siblings when Duke was found negligent in a trial held five years later. Later biographies and her obituaries repeated the original police finding.

In 2020, Peter Lance, a Newport native who had begun his journalism career at The Newport Daily News shortly after the incident, reinvestigated the case in a Vanity Fair article. He initially found that the police file on the case and the transcripts of Tirella's family's wrongful death suit were missing from archives where they would normally be kept, but later found some of those documents. They showed that the investigation into Duke had been cursory and compromised by conflicts of interest. Shortly before the medical examiner arrived at the hospital, for instance, Duke had hired him as her personal physician, meaning anything she told him was protected by doctor-patient privilege.

Lance found that Duke's account of the incident had changed and was inconsistent with the evidence. The parking brake could not have been released in the way she said it had, and all of Tirella's injuries were above his waist, which suggests he was not trapped between the car and the gates when it broke through. The deep grooves the Polara's rear tires left in the gravel suggest considerably more acceleration than would likely have resulted from accidental depression of the gas pedal. Lance and several other experts who reviewed the evidence concluded that it was far likelier that Duke had deliberately run Tirella over.

Shortly after the case was closed, Duke began making considerable philanthropic contributions to the city, including the repair of Cliff Walk around her estate, previously a source of friction between her and the city when her dogs had attacked tourists, and $10,000 to the hospital to which she had been taken the night of the accident. Within months, she established the Newport Restoration Foundation, which has since renovated 84 of the city's colonial era buildings. The police chief retired to Florida within a year and bought two condominiums; he was succeeded as chief by the detective who had investigated the incident, instead of his boss, who was next in line. In Newport, belief persists that Duke "blood money" facilitated a coverup.

== Personal life ==
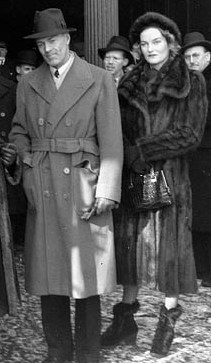
Duke with then-husband James H. R. Cromwell, January 1940

Duke married twice. In 1935, she married James H. R. Cromwell, the son of Eva Stotesbury and stepson of wealthy financier Edward T. Stotesbury. Cromwell was a New Deal advocate like his wife; Duke used her fortune to finance his political career. In 1940, he served several months as U.S. Ambassador to Canada and ran unsuccessfully for the U.S. Senate. The couple had a daughter, Arden, who was born prematurely in Honolulu on July 11, 1940, and died the next day. Duke and Cromwell divorced in 1943.

On September 1, 1947, in Paris, Duke married Porfirio Rubirosa, a diplomat from the Dominican Republic. She was his third wife, and paid his second wife, actress Danielle Darrieux, $1 million to agree to an uncontested divorce. Because of her great wealth, Duke's marriage to Rubirosa attracted the attention of the U.S. State Department, which cautioned her against using her money to promote a political agenda. There was also concern that in the event of her death, a foreign government could gain too much leverage. Rubirosa therefore signed a pre-nuptial agreement. Nonetheless, during the marriage, Duke gave Rubirosa several million dollars in gifts, including a stable of polo ponies, sports cars, a converted B-25 bomber, and, in the divorce settlement, a 17th-century house in Paris. Duke and Rubirosa divorced in October 1948.

In 1965, Duke took in Walker Inman Jr., her half-brother's orphaned 13-year-old son. Lacking parenting skills, she spoiled him and sent him to boarding school.

Duke had numerous love affairs, including with surfing pioneer Duke Kahanamoku, film actor Errol Flynn, British politician Alec Cunningham-Reid, U.S. Army General George S. Patton, jazz pianist Joe Castro, Naval fighter pilot James W. Robb, and U.S. writer Louis Bromfield.

In 1988, Duke posted bail of $5 million for her friend Imelda Marcos after Marcos was arrested for racketeering.

Also in 1988, at the age of 75, Duke legally adopted Chandi Heffner, a 35-year-old Hare Krishna devotee and the sister of billionaire Nelson Peltz's third wife. Duke initially said that Heffner was the reincarnation of her daughter, Arden, who had died the day after she was born in 1940. The two women fell out, and the final version of Duke's will negated the adoption and said that she did not wish Heffner to benefit from her trust funds.

== Net worth ==
Duke was the life beneficiary of two trust funds created by her father, James Buchanan Duke, in 1917 and 1924. When her father died, he left a fortune valued at $100 million, with the largest share going to Duke and her mother. Nanaline was a shrewd businesswoman, often compared to Hetty Green, and when she died in 1962, she left her daughter an estate then estimated to be worth $250 million.

Duke also owned numerous shares in big-name companies, such as General Motors, and had a large financial team of bankers and accountants to manage her holdings. In addition, Duke had a collection of artwork, which was said to include works by Picasso, Van Gogh, Rembrandt and Monet, as well as her collection of Islamic and Southeast Asia art and furniture. Also in Duke's collection were over 2,000 bottles of rare wine (worth over $5 million) and the Duke collection of fine jewels. Her total net worth, including all property, was valued at $5.3 billion.

=== Philanthropy ===
Duke's first major philanthropic act was to establish Independent Aid, Inc., in 1934, when she was 21 years old, in order to manage the many requests for financial assistance addressed to her. In 1958, she established the Duke Gardens Foundation to endow the public display gardens she started to create at Duke Farms. Her Foundation intended that Duke Gardens "reveal the interests and philanthropic aspirations of the Duke family, as well as an appreciation for other cultures and a yearning for global understanding". Duke Gardens were the center of a controversy over the decision by the trustees of the Doris Duke Charitable Foundation (now Doris Duke Foundation) to close them on May 25, 2008.

In 1963, Duke funded the construction of Maharishi Mahesh Yogi's ashram on land leased from the state forestry department of Uttar Pradesh in India. As the Maharishi's International Academy of Meditation, the ashram became the focus of global attention five years later when the Beatles studied there.

In 1968, Duke created the Newport Restoration Foundation with the goal of preserving more than eighty colonial buildings in the town. Former First Lady Jacqueline Kennedy Onassis, with whom Duke was friends, was the vice president and publicly supported the foundation. Duke was also friends with artist Andy Warhol. Historic properties include Rough Point, Samuel Whitehorne House, Prescott Farm, the Buloid-Perry House, the King's Arms Tavern, the Baptist Meetinghouse, and the Cotton House. Seventy-one buildings are rented to tenants. Only five function as museums.

Duke's extensive travels led to an interest in a variety of cultures, and during her lifetime she amassed a considerable collection of Islamic and Southeast Asian art. After her death, numerous pieces were donated to The Asian Art Museum of San Francisco and the Walters Art Museum of Baltimore.

Duke did much additional philanthropic work and was a major benefactor of medical research and child welfare programs. In the late 1980s, Duke donated $2 million to Duke University to be used for AIDS research. Her foundation, Independent Aid, became the Doris Duke Foundation, which still exists as a private grant-making entity. After her death, the Doris Duke Charitable Foundation was established in 1996, supporting four national grant making programs and Doris Duke's three estates, Shangri La, Rough Point, and Duke Farms.

== Death ==
In 1992, at the age of 79, Duke had a facelift. She began trying to walk while she was still heavily medicated and fell, breaking her hip. In January 1993, she underwent surgery for a knee replacement. She was hospitalized from February 2 to April 15. She underwent a second knee surgery in July of that year.

A day after returning home from this second surgery, she had a severe stroke. Doris Duke died at her Falcon Lair home in Los Angeles on October 28, 1993, at the age of 80. The cause was progressive pulmonary edema resulting in cardiac arrest, according to a spokesman.

Duke was cremated 24 hours after her death and her executor, Bernard Lafferty, scattered her ashes into the Pacific Ocean as her last will specified. Rumors and accusations swirled after Duke's death, ranging from suicide to murder, and controversy was exacerbated by Duke's habit of regularly changing her last will and testament, but no criminal charges were ever filed.

== Will ==
When Duke died, her fortune was estimated at more than US$1.2 billion (equivalent to $2.4 billion in 2025).

The income from the trusts her father established was to be payable after her death to any children. Despite the negation of her adoption of Chandi Heffner, after Duke's death, the estate's trustees settled a lawsuit brought by Heffner for $65 million (equivalent to $131 million in 2025). Duke's will created a $7 million (equivalent to $14 million in 2025) trust fund for her nephew Walker Inman Jr, who also had a trust from Duke's mother's estate.

In her final will, Duke left virtually all her fortune to several existing and new charitable foundations. She appointed her butler, Bernard Lafferty, executor of her estate. Lafferty appointed the U.S. Trust company as corporate co-executor. Lafferty and Duke's friend Marion Oates Charles were named as her trustees.

Several lawsuits were filed against the will. The best-known was initiated by Harry Demopoulos. In an earlier will, Demopoulos had been named executor and challenged Lafferty's appointment. Demopolous argued that Lafferty and his lawyers had cajoled a sick, sedated woman into giving him control of her estate.

Even more sensational accusations were made by a nurse, Tammy Payette, who contended that Lafferty and a prominent Beverly Hills physician, Charles Kivowitz, had conspired to hasten Duke's death with morphine and Demerol. In 1996, the year Lafferty died, the Los Angeles District Attorney's office ruled there was no firm evidence of foul play.

Duke University also sued, claiming entitlement to a larger share of Duke's assets than the $10 million (equivalent to $20 million in 2025) provided in the will, although the will also said that any beneficiary who disputed its provisions should receive nothing.

Litigation involving 40 lawyers at 10 law firms tied up Duke's estate for nearly three years. New York courts ultimately removed Lafferty for using estate funds for his own support and U.S. Trust for failing "to do anything to stop him". In 1996, the Surrogate Court of Manhattan overrode Duke's will and appointed new trustees from among those who had challenged it: Harry Demopoulos; J. Carter Brown (later also involved in overturning Albert C. Barnes's will); Marion Oates Charles, the sole trustee from Duke's last will; James Gill, a lawyer; Nannerl O. Keohane, president of Duke University; and John J. Mack, president of Morgan Stanley. The fees for their lawsuits exceeded $10 million (equivalent to $19 million in 2025), and were paid by the estate. These trustees took control of all assets of the Doris Duke Charitable Foundation, which Duke had directed should support medical research, anti-vivisectionism, prevention of cruelty to children and animals, performance arts, wildlife, and ecology.

The DDCF also controls funding for the three separate foundations created to operate Duke's former homes: the Doris Duke Foundation for Islamic Art, Duke Farms, and Newport Restoration Foundation. The trustees gradually reduced these foundations' funding, saying that Duke's own works were "perpetuating the Duke family history of personal passions and conspicuous consumption." The foundations later sold some assets and closed Duke Gardens. Auction house Christie's published a heavily illustrated catalog of more than 600 pages for its auction of "The Doris Duke Collection, sold to benefit the Doris Duke Charitable Foundation", held in New York City over three days in 2004.

== In popular culture ==
=== Biographies ===
- Stephanie Mansfield's The Richest Girl in the World (Putnam 1994).
- Pony Duke, her disinherited nephew, and Jason Thomas published Too Rich: The Family Secrets of Doris Duke (1996).
- Ted Schwarz with Tom Rybak, co-authored by one of Duke's staff, Trust No One (1997).
- Sallie Bingham's The Silver Swan: In Search of Doris Duke (2020).

=== Films and television ===
- Too Rich: The Secret Life of Doris Duke (1999), based on Mansfield's book, a television miniseries starring Lauren Bacall as Duke, and Richard Chamberlain as Lafferty.
- Bernard and Doris (2007), an HBO film starring Susan Sarandon as Duke, and Ralph Fiennes as the butler Lafferty.
- Rubirosa (2018), a Mexican web television series co-starring Katarina Čas as Doris Duke.
- As the Money Burns (2020–present), a history podcast reconstructing the Great Depression through the lives of heirs and heiresses. As a primary heiress, Doris Duke appears in multiple episodes beginning with the very first, "Trust No One", which covers her father Buck Duke's death. Other episodes include her bow at Buckingham Palace, her debutante ball, and other key events and moments in her life.
