= Harry Demopoulos =

American medical researcher

Harry B. Demopoulos was an American researcher in the medical aspects of free radicals, especially in the areas of ischaemic injury, the toxicity of anticancer drugs, and in spinal cord injury. He was also a film actor, appearing in Clint Eastwood films.

== Free radical research ==
Ischaemic injury (injury to cells due to oxygen deprivation) is an important cause of morbidity and mortality in humans. For example, most deaths in stroke and heart attack are secondary to ischaemic injury, a consequence of the ischemic cascade. Thus, much research has been done into the causes and treatment of ischaemic injury. One are of this research involves the essential role of free radicals (reactive oxygen species and the like) as modulators of ischaemic injury. This has resulted in therapeutic advances, such as the radical-scavenging neuroprotective agent NXY-059, which was under development for the treatment of stroke.

Demopoulos and his coworkers were active in this research. The opening sentence of a paper by Nita et al. states: "The concept of generation of free radicals during ischemia was first presented by Demopoulos, Flamm and co-workers..."

== Doris Duke Charitable Foundation ==
Although Doris Duke made Demopoulos co-executor of her will, she later replaced him with Bernard Lafferty. After Duke's death, Demopoulos and others sued to remove Lafferty. Demopoulos subsequently sat on the board of trustees of the Doris Duke Charitable Foundation established under the will.

== Personal life ==
Dr. Demopoulos was also a friend of Clint Eastwood, in whose films he appeared, and who also invested in his research for decades before Demopoulos's death on June 29, 2016.

== Filmography ==
Year	Title	Role	Notes
1983	Sudden Impact	Dr. Barton	with Clint Eastwood
1984	City Heat	Roman Orgy Patron	with Clint Eastwood
1986	Cobra	Dr. Demopoulos	with Sylvester Stallone
1988	The Dead Pool	Doctor in Hospital Room	with Clint Eastwood (final film role)
