= Newport Restoration Foundation =

Foundation by Doris Duke to preserve early housing stock

Coordinates: 41.48966°N 71.31341°W

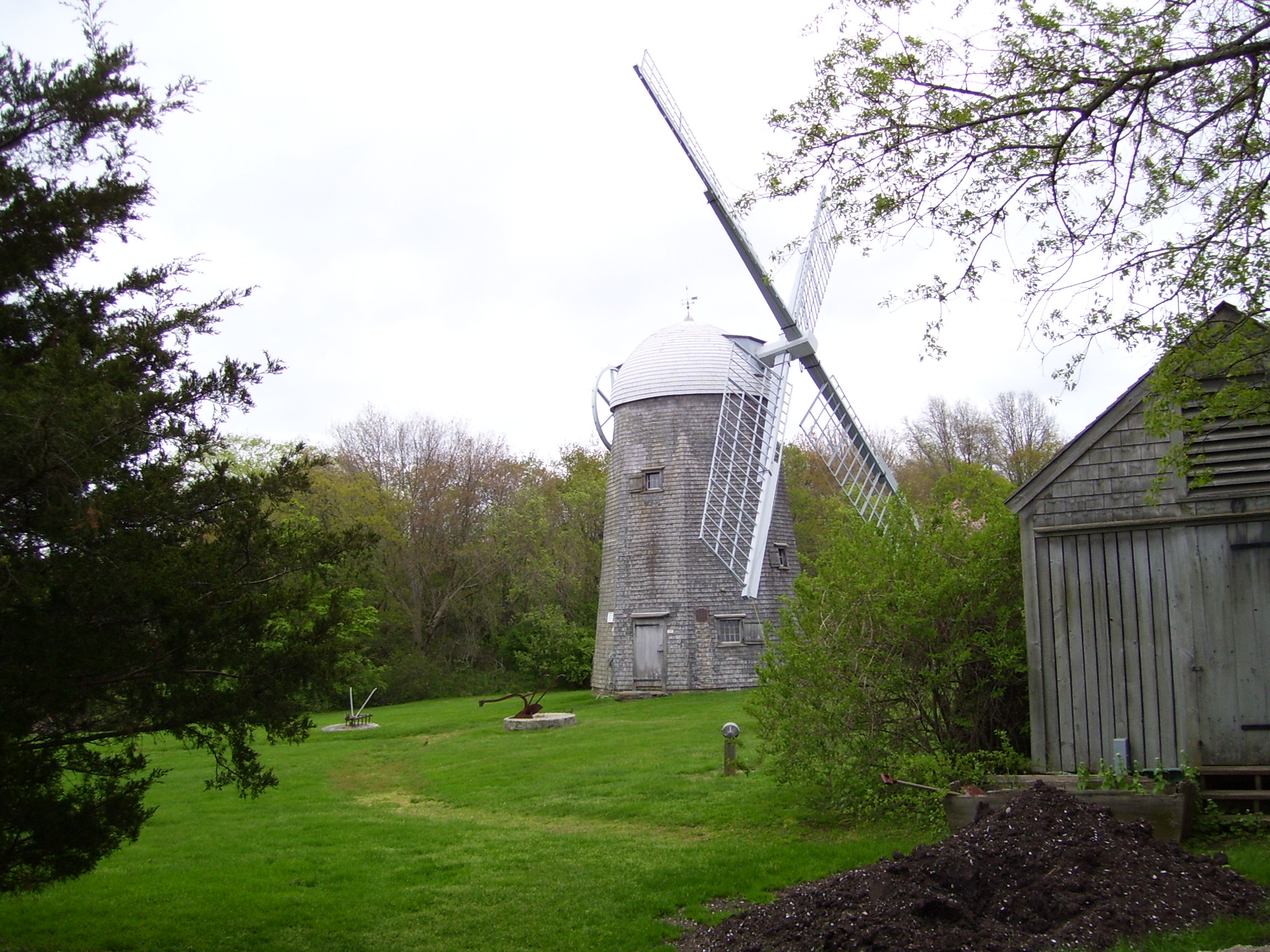
c. 1811 windmill on Prescott Farm

The Newport Restoration Foundation was founded by Doris Duke in 1968 in Newport, Rhode Island to preserve the architectural and cultural heritage of Newport, including 18th century colonial homes. Former First Lady Jacqueline Kennedy Onassis was the foundation's vice president.

It is the largest collection of vernacular architecture in the Northeastern United States. In the 1960s, structures in Newport were threatened by redevelopment. Doris Duke purchased and restored over 83 individual houses under her direction. The entire project represents one of the largest preservation efforts undertaken in modern times and is currently led by executive directors, Amy Elizabeth-Winsor, Alyssa Lozupone, and Gina Tangorra.

== Properties ==
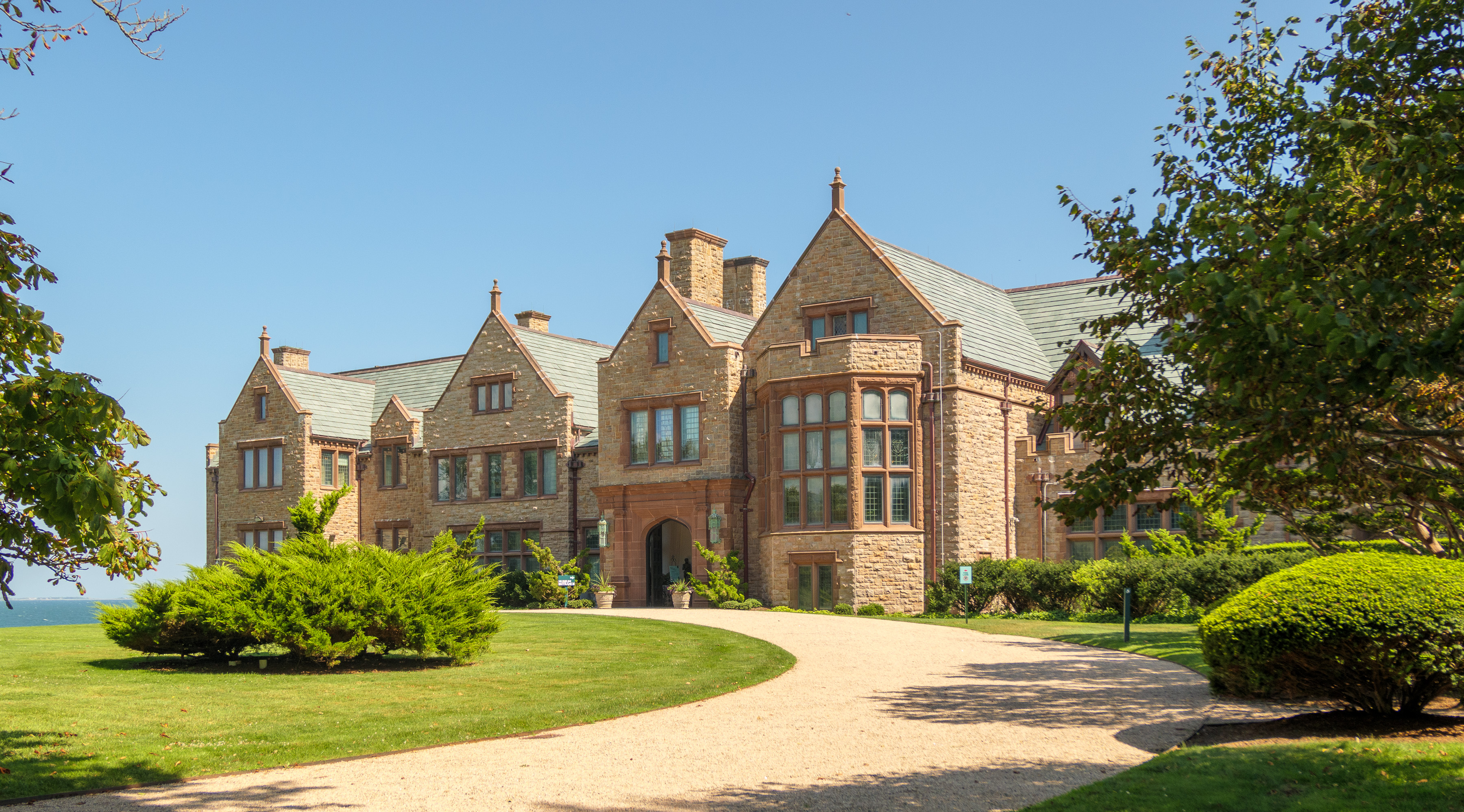
Rough Point

The NRF owns 78 significant historical properties, 72 of which are rented to tenants. 67 of the historic buildings are in Newport, and 8 buildings are museums. One of the historical properties includes Doris Duke's Rough Point which was built in 1891 and then added on to in 1924. Rough Point is a Newport mansion with a collection of European and Asian fine arts with works by Pierre-Auguste Renoir, Thomas Gainsborough, Joshua Reynolds, and Sir Anthony van Dyck. The property list also includes the Samuel Whitehorne House (built 1811), the William Vernon House (built c. 1708 and expanded 1759), the Buloid-Perry House, King's Arms Tavern, and The Dr. Charles Cotton House, and the Christopher Townsend House, (built 1728). In addition, the foundation runs Prescott Farm, an outdoor history site in Middletown, RI.

== Recent projects ==
The Newport Restoration Foundation has been actively restoring and preserving historic buildings, a collection of the arts of cabinetmaking and building trades of the Newport region, and the art and artifacts from Doris Duke's life in Newport. NRF also utilizes these collections for museum tours and educational programs that are open to the public. In regard to preservation, their most recent project (2015) was that Dayton-James House from 1757. In 2005 the Foundation assisted in conducting the first dendrochronology survey of tree rings in several early buildings in Rhode Island to determine their construction dates, including the Wilbour-Ellery House. In addition in 2013, the NRF led an effort to create a new park in Queen Anne's Square by artist and architect Maya Lin, entitled "The Meeting Room".

Preservation advocacy and environmental concerns such as climate change are other areas in which NRF works in. For example, they held the Keeping History Above Water Conference in an attempt to protect historic properties from being affected by rising sea levels.
