= Doris Duke Foundation =

American charitable foundation

The Doris Duke Foundation (DDF) is a charitable foundation based in the United States. It was established in 1996, following the 1993 death of billionaire heiress Doris Duke, who bequeathed the bulk of her $1.2 billion fortune to the Foundation, with the mission of providing grants for performing arts, the environment, education, child welfare, medical research, and fostering goodwill and inclusion with the Muslim community of the United States.

The Foundation has given several significant awards to individual artists in the performing arts, including the Doris Duke Dance Award for New Work, and a large unrestricted grant, the Doris Duke Artist Award, a program which began in 2011 and was previously called the Doris Duke Performing Artist Initiative.

== Administration ==
Doris Duke's friend and adviser, Bernard Lafferty, was named executor of the will and a trustee of the foundation. The will also named a friend, Marian Oates Charles, as a trustee, but gave Lafferty authority to appoint the other three members of the board. Lafferty died on November 4, 1996, at age 51.

The Board of Trustees is currently chaired by Samsher Gill, and Anthony Fauci serves as Vice Chair.

== See also ==
- Shangri La (Doris Duke)
- Doris Duke Artist Award
