= Richard Prescott =

British Army officer

Lieutenant-General Richard Prescott
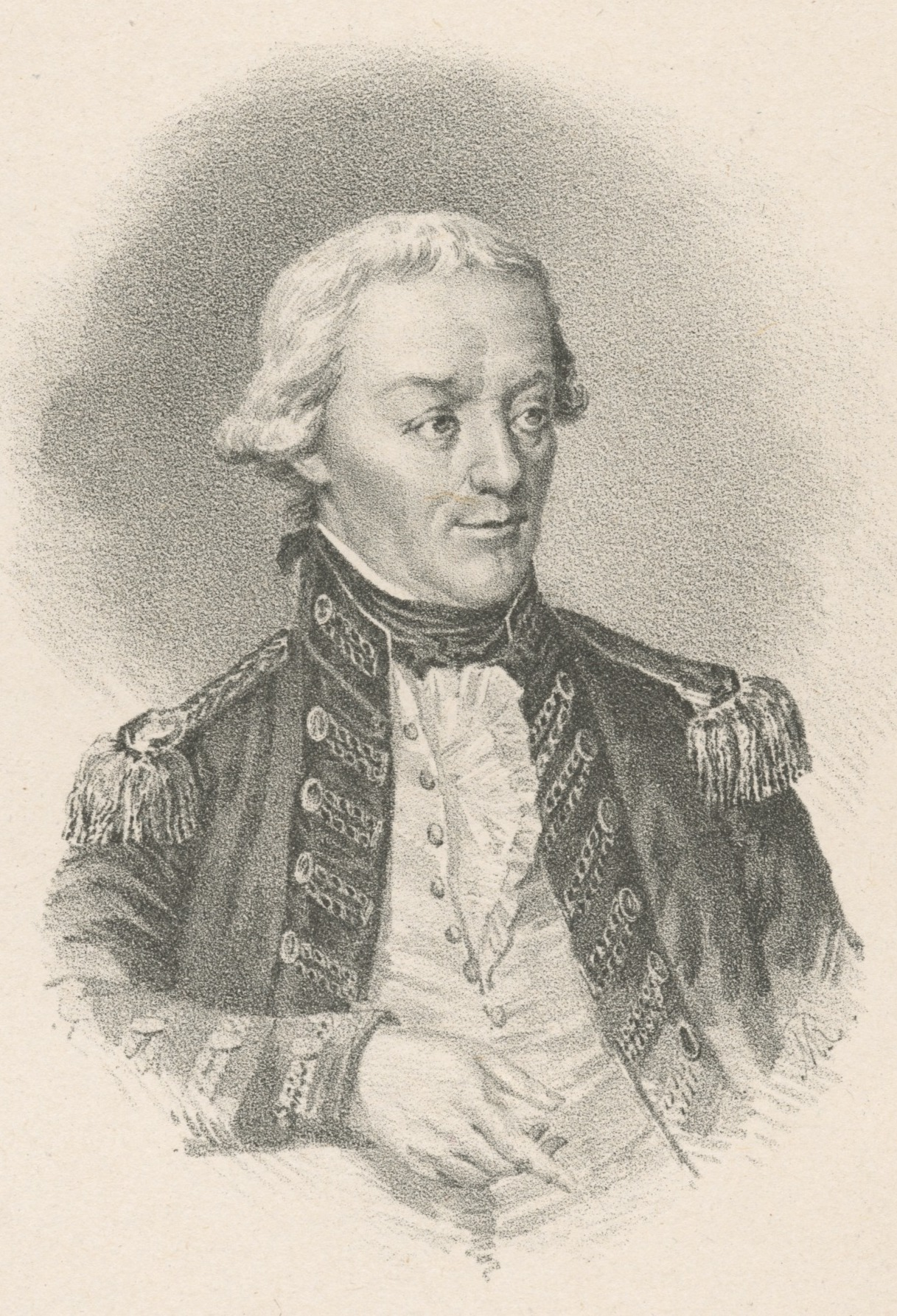
- Born: 1725; England
- Died: 19 October 1788 (aged 62–63); England
- Military career
- Allegiance: Great Britain
- Branch: British Army
- Rank: Lieutenant-General
- Conflicts: Seven Years' War; American War of Independence

Lieutenant-General Richard Prescott (1725 – 19 October 1788) was a British Army officer who served in the Seven Years' War and American War of Independence.

== Military career ==
Prescott was appointed a major of the 33rd Regiment of Foot on 20 December 1756. He transferred to the 72nd Regiment of Foot on 9 May 1758, and became lieutenant-colonel of the 17th Regiment of Foot on 14 December 1761. He transferred to the 50th Regiment of Foot in May 1762, with which he served in the Holy Roman Empire during the Seven Years' War.

Prescott transferred to the 7th Regiment of Foot and was brevetted colonel in the army on 25 June 1772; he went to Canada in 1773. On the reduction of Montreal by the Americans in 1775, Prescott attempted to take Quebec from American forces in 1775, but was forced to surrender to the Americans on 17 November. In September 1776, he was exchanged for General John Sullivan. In November, he became colonel of his regiment. In December, he was third in command of the expedition against Rhode Island, where he remained in command of the British forces before the Battle of Rhode Island.

Lieutenant-Colonel William Barton and a force of 40 men captured Prescott at his quarters on Prescott Farm in Rhode Island on 10 July 1777 and took him to Providence. Prescott was eventually moved and imprisoned in Connecticut, splitting time between East Windsor and Enfield. He was later again exchanged, this time for General Charles Lee. Prescott resumed his command in Rhode Island but was almost immediately superseded by Sir Robert Pigot.

== Notes ==
Military offices
Preceded by Lord Robert Bertie	Colonel of the 7th Regiment of Foot (Royal Fuzileers); 1776–1788	Succeeded by Hon. William Gordon
