= Prescott Farm =

Historic preservation of a colonial farm in Rhode Island

Coordinates: 41.5526787°N 71.2904293°W

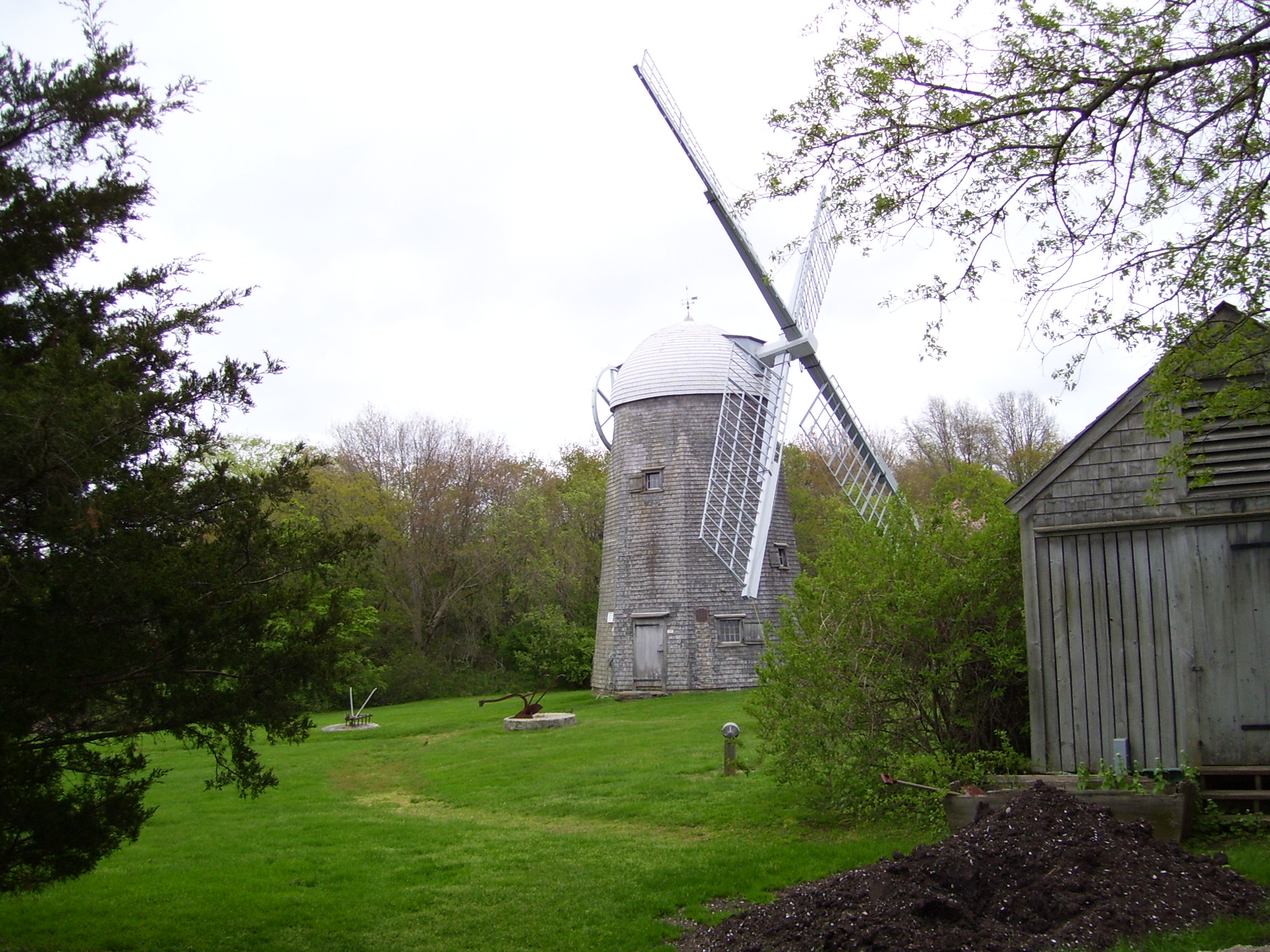
ca. 1811 windmill on the farm

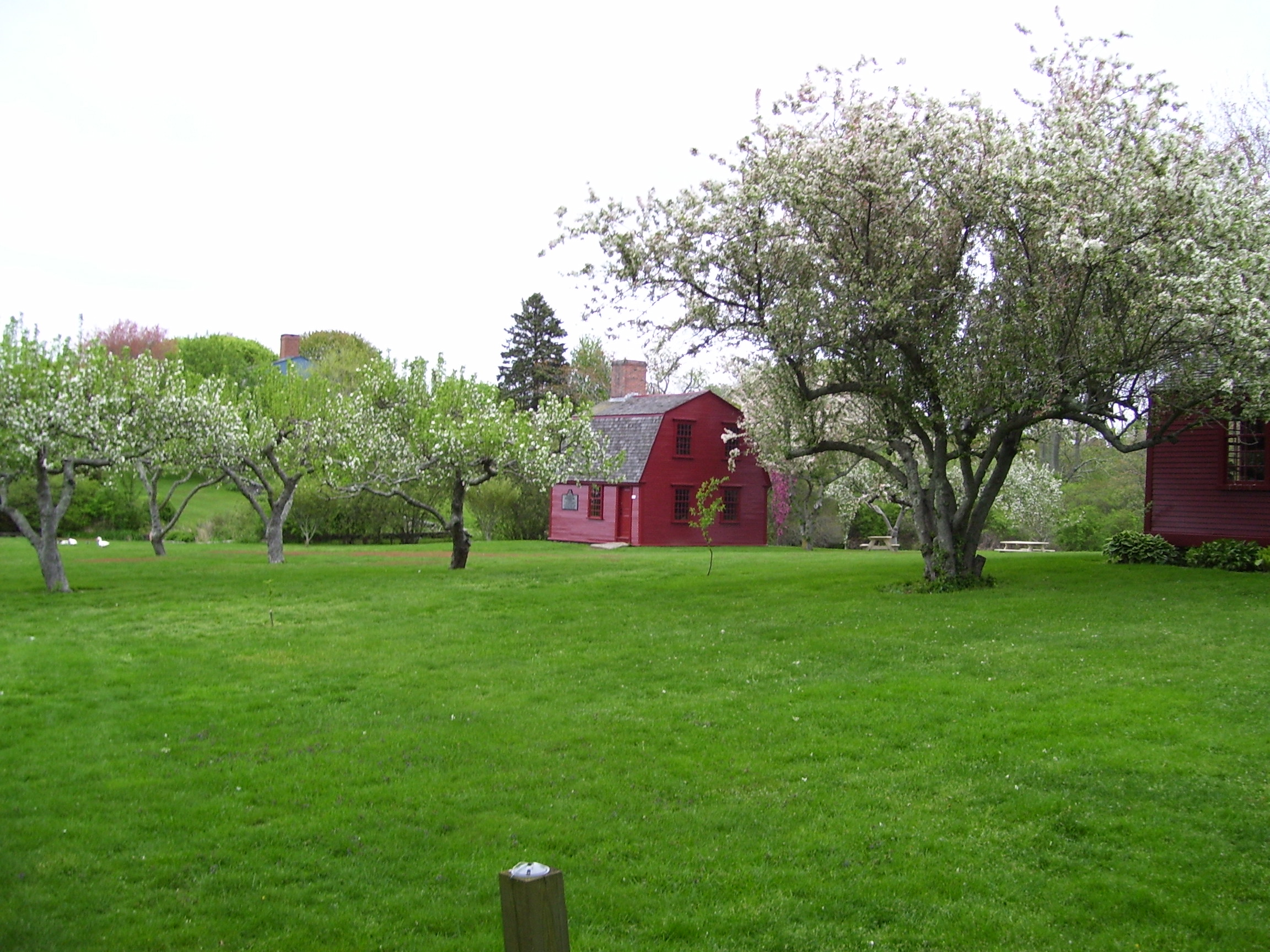
farmhouse

Prescott Farm is a historic preservation of a colonial farm in Middletown (Newport County), Rhode Island. It spans 40 acres (16 ha), and was in danger of demolition before Doris Duke bought it in 1973 and began restoration of the historical site. Notable features of it include an operational windmill (c. 1812), British General Prescott's Guard House, a county store (c. 1715), and a University of Rhode Island Master Gardener project with the purpose of simulating a historical vegetable garden through careful research on what crops where grown during that time period. The farm itself is typical of the farms on Aquidneck Island.

== History ==
The farm was founded in the 18th century. According to some sources, it was originally named Overing and Page Farm in Portsmouth, Rhode Island, founded by brothers Thomas Nichols and Edmund Nichols in 1650. However, it seems that the two brothers moved to Newport in 1654, so it is not clear whether or not the two farms are the same. British General Richard Prescott occupied the farm prior to the Battle of Rhode Island. He was kidnapped there on July 9, 1777 by a small contingent of Rhode Island militia and taken to Providence. Prescott was later exchanged for U.S. General Charles Lee. In 1973, Doris Duke's Newport Restoration Foundation purchased the land and opened it to the public. In 2007, the University of Rhode Island Master Gardeners began their project.

== Current status ==
While most of the farm is open to the public, certain properties are privately rented out and thus not accessible to the public. These include the Overing House and the Potter House (c. 1970). Prescott Farm's current attractions include showcased buildings, a pond, and several walking paths. The garden currently donates all of its produce to Lucy’s Hearth, a nearby women’s shelter.
