= Too Rich: The Secret Life of Doris Duke =

Television miniseries directed by John Erman

- Genre: Drama, miniseries
- Directed by: John Erman
- Starring: Lauren Bacall; Richard Chamberlain; Lindsay Frost; Hayden Panettiere; Kathleen Quinlan
- Narrated by: Lauren Bacall
- Composer: Patrick Williams
- Country of origin: United States
- Original language: English
- No. of episodes: 4

Production
- Executive producers: Martin Rabbett; Robert M. Sertner; Bernard Sofronski; Frank von Zerneck
- Producers: Richard D. Arredondo; John Erman; Stephanie Germai; Randy Sutter
- Production locations: Hawaii; Los Angeles, California; Montreal, Quebec
- Editors: Mark Conte; Paul Dixon
- Running time: 192 minutes (48 minutes per episode)

Original release
- Network: CBS
- Release: February 21 – February 23, 1999

Too Rich: The Secret Life of Doris Duke is a 1999 American four-part television miniseries starring Lauren Bacall and Richard Chamberlain which was first broadcast on CBS on February 21 and 23, 1999. It was based primarily on the book The Richest Girl in the World by Stephanie Mansfield (Pinnacle Books issued a special movie tie-in edition of the book in February 1999) as well as Bob Colacello's two in-depth articles about Ms. Duke in Vanity Fair. Colacello was the magazine's authority on Doris Duke.

The title of the series was derived from the book Too Rich: The Family Secrets of Doris Duke by Pony Duke and Jason Thomas. Manfield's book was the first to be obtained by CBS, which optioned it for a planned miniseries in early 1995. The Duke-Thomas book, which was "being peddled as a miniseries" by the authors months before publication (it was not published until December 1995), was originally optioned earlier that year by the producer Doris Keating, who planned a miniseries of her own.

Too Rich: The Secret Life of Doris Duke presents a dramatized account of the life of the heiress, philanthropist, and once richest woman in the world, Doris Duke. It has since been re-broadcast on The Hallmark Channel, and on Lifetimes combined and presented as a 192-minute movie. The film stars Hayden Panettiere as young Doris Duke, Lindsay Frost as 20- to 50-year-old Doris Duke, and Lauren Bacall as an elderly Doris Duke. Bacall, who had met Doris Duke a few times, was pleased to have been able to appear in a TV miniseries, devoting a few paragraphs to the experience in her autobiography.

While Bacall, Chamberlain and Frost were highly praised for their roles, most reviews of the miniseries were generally unfavorable. The Orlando Sentinel went so far as to say: "If the real Duke were talking, a curse on the filmmakers would be likely."

Another film about the relationship between Duke and her butler, Bernard Lafferty, Bernard and Doris, directed by Bob Balaban and starring Susan Sarandon and Ralph Fiennes, was released in 2007 to much greater critical acclaim, receiving three Golden Globe and ten Emmy nominations.

== Plot outline ==
Doris Duke, the famous real-life billionairess, is seen going over her life as she prepares to die. Her life includes the early death of her loving father, being raised by a cold mother, two marriages and numerous affairs that still leave her hungry for love, a fascination with mystics and reincarnation, and a disastrous adoption late in life. Even now as she is dying, her roller-coaster life has one last bump in it: her butler, Bernard Lafferty, is suspected of arranging her death so he can get all her money.

== Cast ==
- Lauren Bacall as Doris Duke (elderly)
  - Hayden Panettiere as Young Doris Duke
  - Lindsay Frost as Doris Duke (age 20s to 50s)
- Richard Chamberlain as Bernard Lafferty
- Mare Winningham as Chandi Heffner
- Kathleen Quinlan as Nanaline Duke
- Michael Nouri as Porfirio Rubirosa
- Joe Don Baker as Buck Duke
- Roberta Maxwell as Myra
- Sheila McCarthy as Tammy
- Lisa Banes as Barbara Hutton
- Brian Stokes Mitchell as Duke Kahanamoku
- Brian Dennehy as Louis Bromfield
- Liam Cunningham as Alec Cunningham-Reid
- Anthony Lemke as Walker Inman
- Howard McGillin as James H.R. Cromwell

== Accolades ==
Award	Category	Subject	Result
Online Film & Television Association Awards	Best Actress in a Motion Picture or Miniseries	Lauren Bacall	Nominated
