= Bernard Lafferty =

Irish butler (1945–1996)

- Born: 14 April 1945; Creeslough, County Donegal, Ireland
- Died: 4 November 1996 (aged 51); Beverly Hills, California, U.S.
- Occupation(s): Butler, heir to Doris Duke
- Relatives: Jim McCalliog (cousin)

Bernard Lafferty (14 April 1945 – 4 November 1996) was an Irish butler and heir to American tobacco heiress and philanthropist, Doris Duke. Duke hired Lafferty in 1987 and named him the executor of her $1.2 billion estate six months prior to her death in October 1993. Their unorthodox relationship sparked controversy and speculation, although no charges were ever filed against Lafferty regarding her death.

== Early life ==
Bernard Lafferty was born on April 14, 1945, in Creeslough, County Donegal, Ireland. He was the only child of Edward Lafferty (1901–1964) and Angela McCalliog (1915–1965). He was a first cousin of Scottish former footballer Jim McCalliog. He moved to Glasgow, Scotland, with his mother shortly after his father's death in September 1964. One year later, Lafferty was orphaned at 20 years old when his mother was hit by a motorcycle the following August.

== Career and Doris Duke ==
Lafferty emigrated to the United States to live with his aunt in Philadelphia around 1980. Lafferty became the maître d' at The Bellevue-Stratford Hotel. He befriended many famous and influential people during his tenure, including Sophia Loren, Elizabeth Taylor and Peggy Lee.

In 1987, Lafferty was hired by tobacco heiress, socialite, and philanthropist, Doris Duke as her personal butler at "Duke Farms", her home in Hillsborough, NJ. Lafferty soon endeared himself to Duke, becoming her close confidant, travelling with her worldwide during his six years as her employee. Although Duke was a public figure, she spent her twilight years privately and mostly with Lafferty. Much of what actually transpired between them must be left to speculation, but the consensus is they maintained a relatively healthy friendship.

Duke made Lafferty the executor of her estate six months before she died in 1993. After Duke's death, Lafferty managed her many philanthropic endeavors as directed in her will. Lafferty relinquished control as co-executor of the Duke estate in a 1995 settlement with Duke's disinherited adopted daughter.

== Death ==
Lafferty purchased a $2.5 million mansion in Bel Air, where he resided until he died, three years later, in his sleep of a heart attack in 1996. As specified in his will, Lafferty's ashes were scattered off Hawaii, where he had previously scattered Duke's ashes.

== In popular culture ==
In 1999, Lafferty was portrayed by Richard Chamberlain in a four-part television miniseries titled, Too Rich: The Secret Life of Doris Duke.

In 2007, HBO Films produced a semi-fictional film about Duke and Lafferty in a movie titled Bernard and Doris, starring Susan Sarandon and Ralph Fiennes.
