= Newport Cliff Walk =

Walkway in Rhode Island, US

Coordinates: 41.4672°N 71.3021°W

Newport Cliff Walk

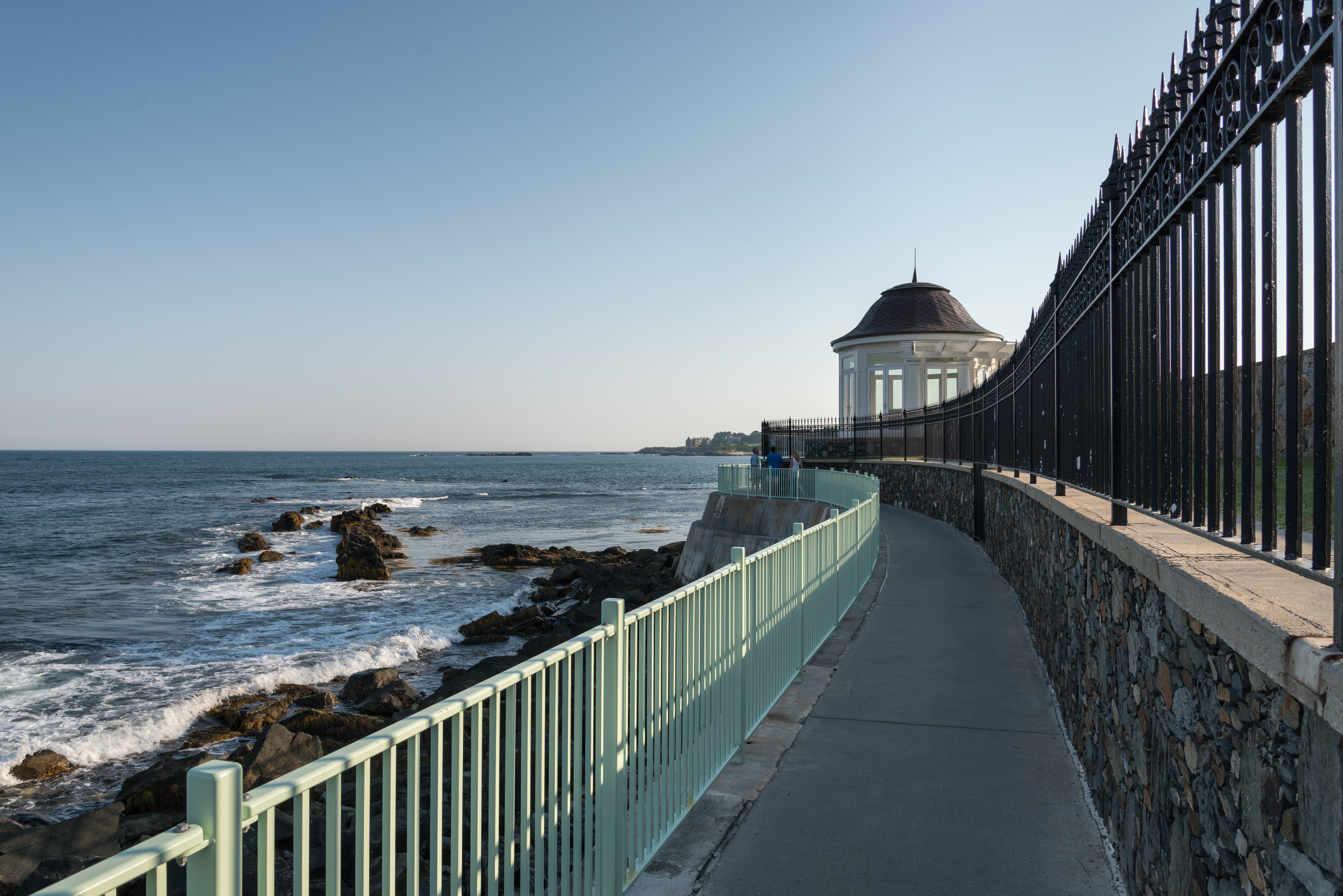
The Cliff Walk

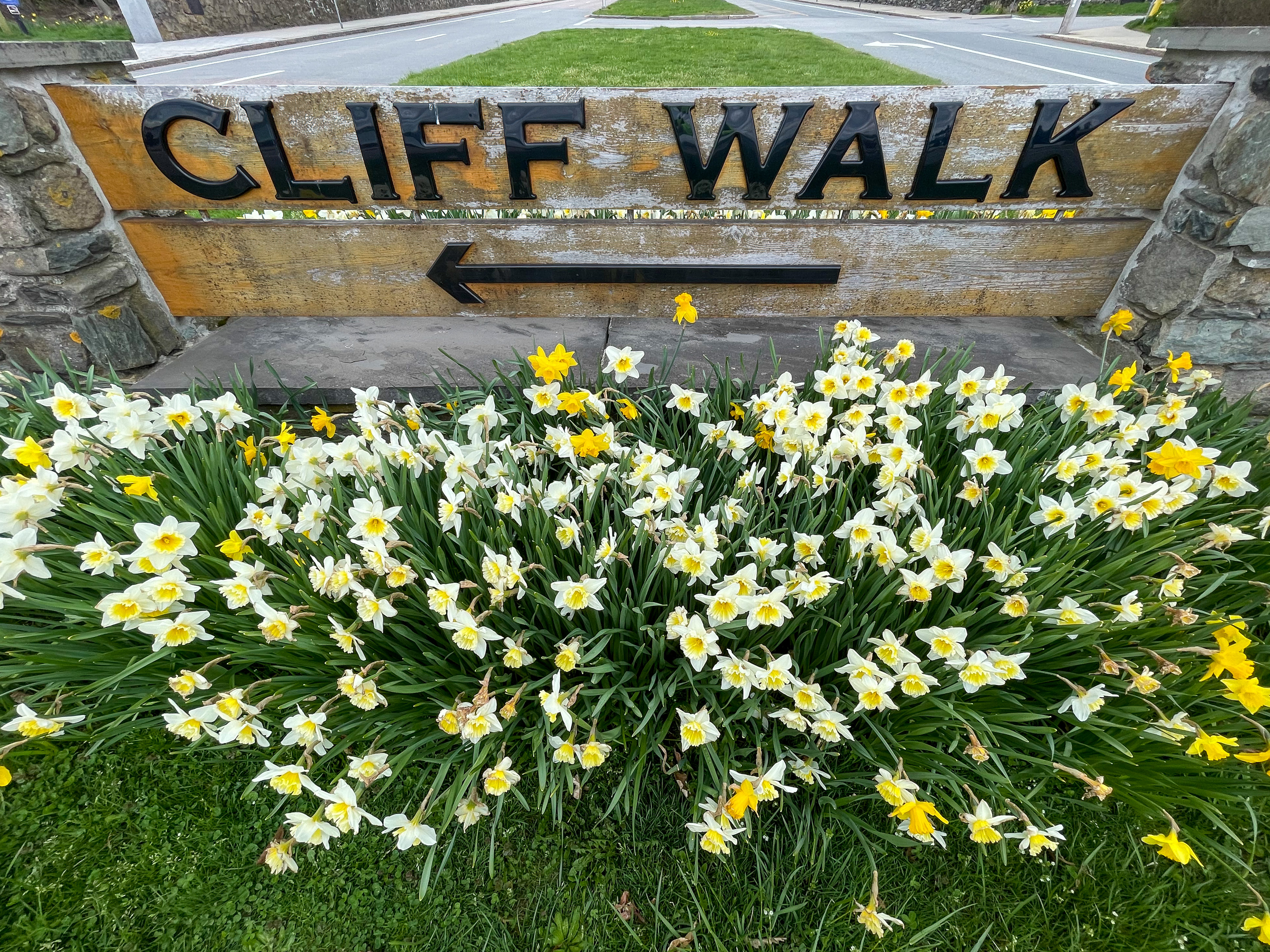
Sign at Memorial Blvd

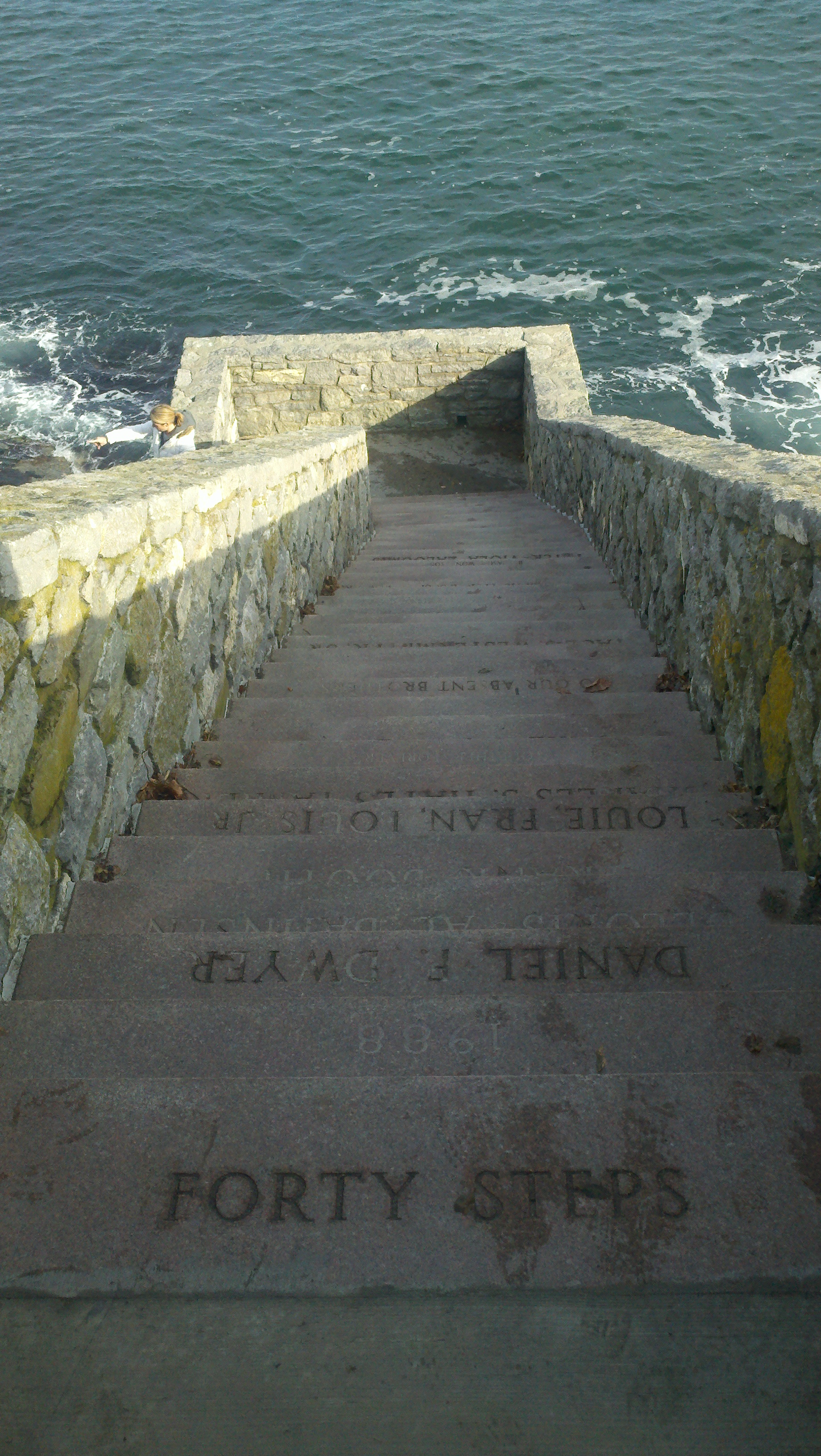
The Forty Steps

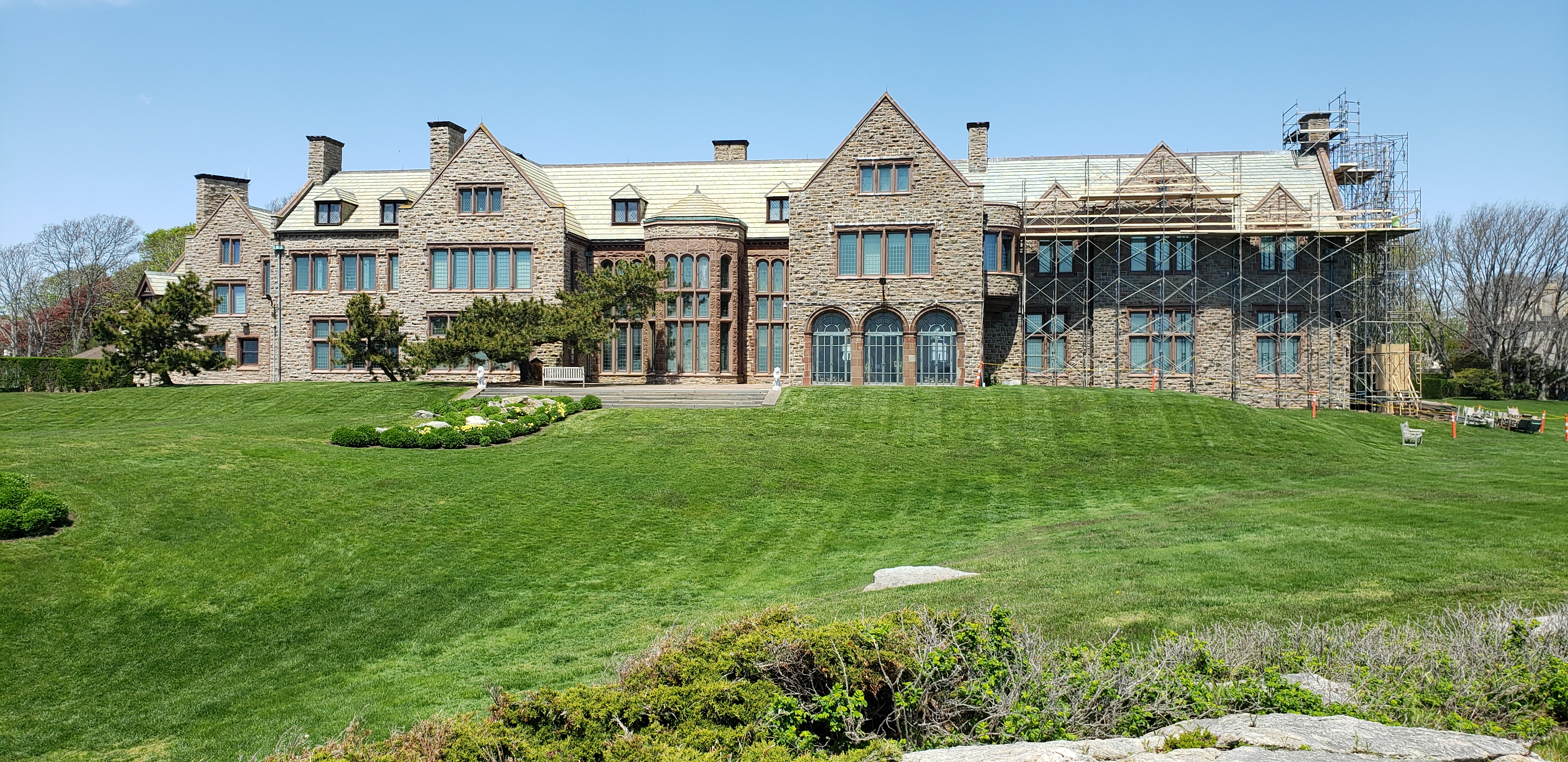
Rough Point viewed from the Cliff Walk

The Newport Cliff Walk is considered one of the top attractions in Newport, Rhode Island, in the United States. It is a 3.5-mile (5.6 km) public access walkway that borders the shore line. It has been designated a National Recreation Trail, the first in New England.

The Cliff Walk starts from the east end of Bailey's Beach to the western end of First Beach. There are public access points at Bellevue Avenue, Ledge Road, Marine Avenue, Ruggles Avenue, Sheppard Avenue, Webster Street, Narragansett Avenue, and Memorial Boulevard.

The Cliff Walk provides views of The Breakers, Marble House, Rough Point, and other prominent mansions from the Gilded Age as well as views into the Narragansett Bay.

== History ==
The legal precedents for the Cliff Walk date back to 1663, when the charter granted by King Charles II promised Rhode Island colonists the right to fish along the shoreline. This right of public access to the shore was later guaranteed in the Rhode Island state constitution.

The coastline remained undeveloped until around 1880, when owners of the Gilded Age mansions started building a simple path along the coast, in sections. Over the decades, many disputes have erupted between landowners and the public about access to the walk, with wealthy owners sometimes erecting fences, boulders, or walls along the route.

== Damage and repairs ==
Storms and hurricanes, including the New England hurricane of 1938 and Hurricane Carol in 1954, have repeatedly caused damage to parts of the Cliff Walk, followed by repair and rebuilding. In the 1970s, the U.S. Army Corps of Engineers spent two years doing repairs. In 1993 and 1994, $3.4 million was spent on new retaining walls. Hurricane Bob caused damage in 1991.

=== Hurricane Sandy ===
In October 2012, a storm surge caused by Hurricane Sandy washed away large sections of the Cliff Walk. The walk was closed through June 2014, when it reopened after a $5.2 million restoration.

=== 2022 Collapse ===
On March 3, 2022, a 20-foot section of the Cliff Walk collapsed near Webster Street and Narragansett Avenue. No injuries were reported, and the cause of the collapse is currently unknown. As of March 4, the area near the site of the collapse will remain closed "for the foreseeable future", with public safety crews continuing to assess the damage.
