= Rough Point =

Mansion in Newport, Rhode Island, US

Coordinates: 41°27′18.8″N 71°18′19.6″W

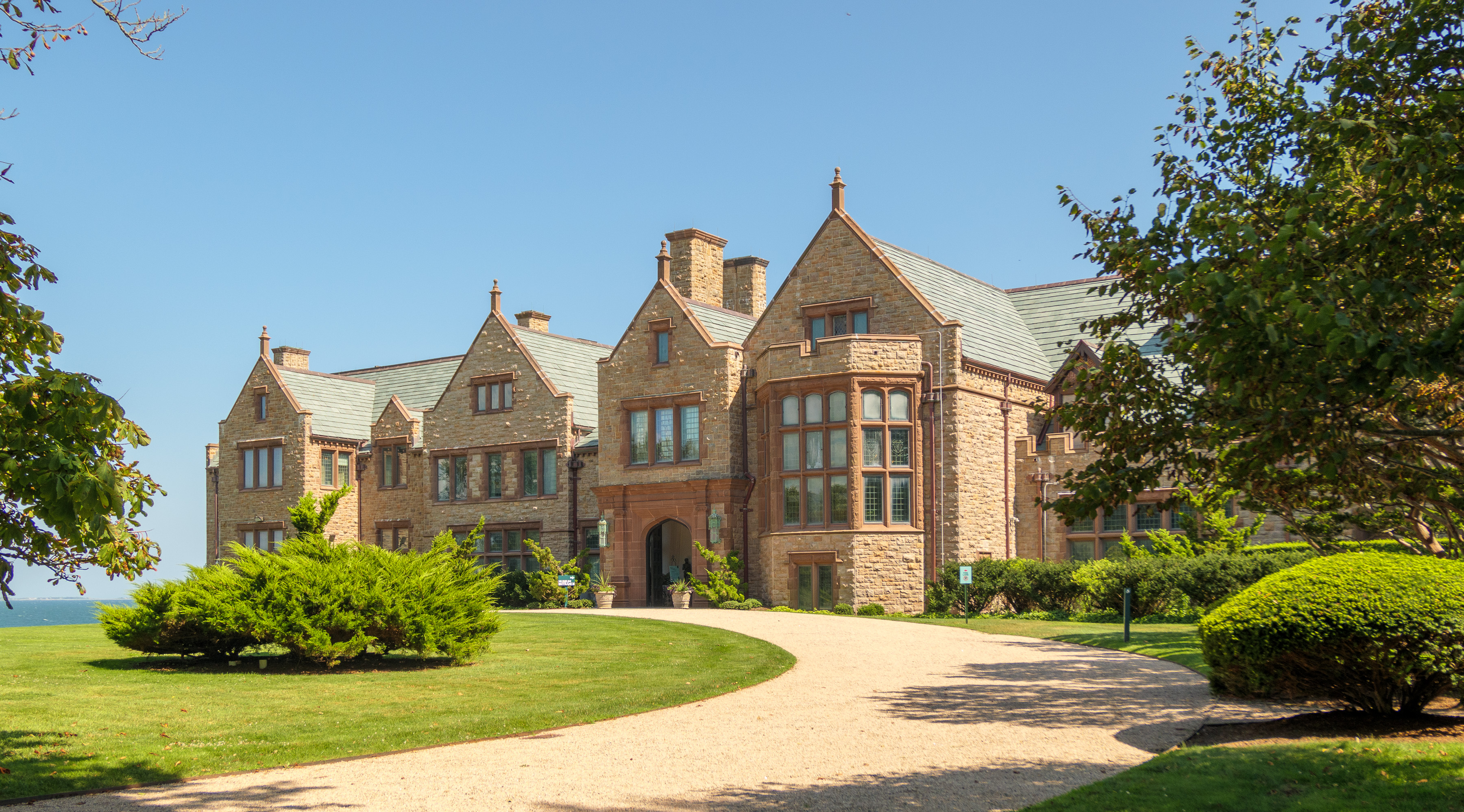
Rough Point front

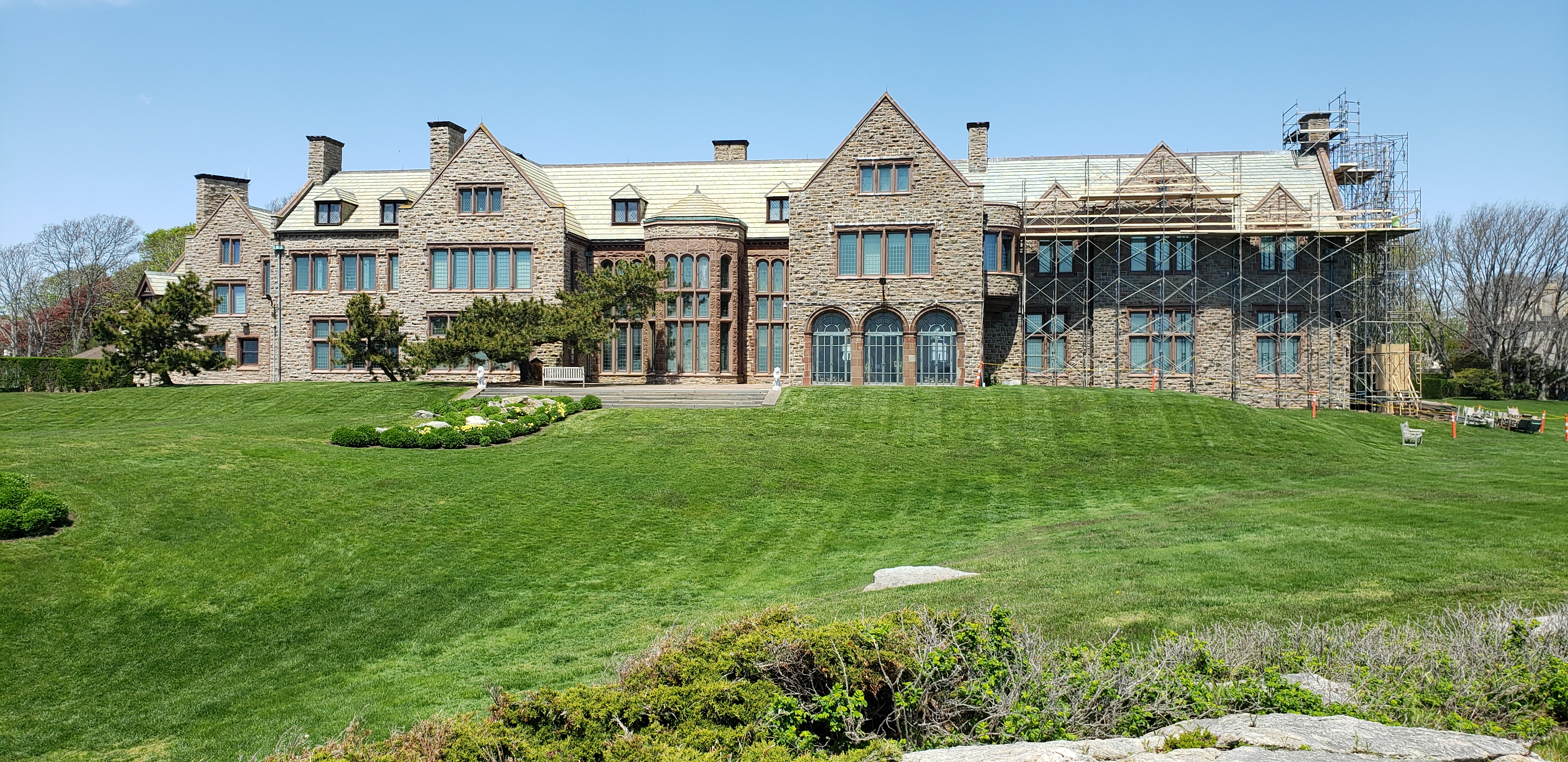
Rough Point viewed from the Newport Cliff Walk

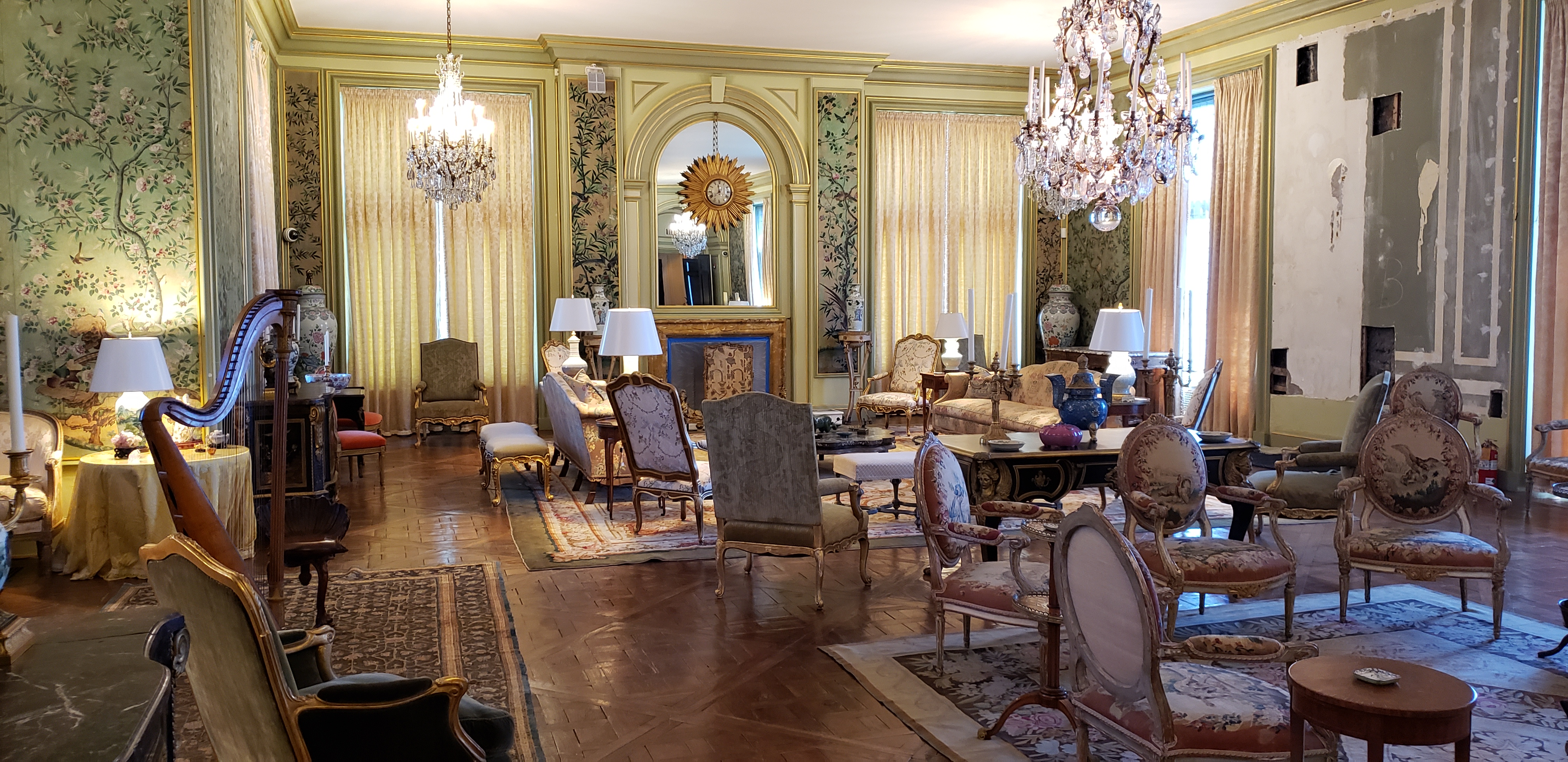
Rough Point music room

Rough Point is one of the Gilded Age mansions of Newport, Rhode Island, now open to the public as a museum. It is an English Manorial style home designed by architectural firm Peabody & Stearns for Frederick William Vanderbilt. Construction on the red sandstone and granite began in 1887 and was completed 1892. It is located on Bellevue Avenue and borders the Cliff Walk and overlooks the Atlantic Ocean. The original gardens were designed by Frederick Law Olmsted’s firm. The home's last owner was Doris Duke and it is currently owned and operated by the Newport Restoration Foundation.

== History ==
In 1894, the Vanderbilts began renting Rough Point to summer guests. William Bateman Leeds Sr., known as the ‘Tinplate King’, rented the home in 1904 and 1905. He was one of the owners of American Tin Plate Company, a tin plate trust. He purchased the 10-acre (40,000 m^{2}) estate in 1906. After he died in 1908, his wife, Nancy Leeds, used John Russell Pope to make some exterior alterations to the home. She remained the owner until 1922. Their son, William Bateman Leeds Jr., married Princess Xenia Georgievna of Russia.

In 1922, James Buchanan Duke, the founder of fortunes in electric power and tobacco, and benefactor of Duke University, and his second wife Nanaline bought the house. They used architect Horace Trumbauer of Philadelphia to assist in renovating the house; two new wings were added to the home. Nanaline hired design firm White Allom to transform the home's dark interiors. James died at his Fifth Avenue and 78th Street, New York City, white-limestone mansion in 1925, bequeathing his enormous fortune, along with its several residences, to his only child, 12-year-old Doris Duke. Rough Point, which came close to being sold twice at Nanaline's insistence nonetheless eventually became one of Doris' most prized properties, replete with its spectacular rocky coastal setting. Doris's memorable debutante ball was held at the estate in 1929.

Doris Duke continued to spend her summers at Rough Point; but, after the New England Hurricane of 1938 that devastated Rhode Island, and with the advent of World War II, Doris Duke's visits became less frequent. In the early 1950s, Doris Duke took up permanent residence in New York City and emptied Rough Point of all its furnishings.

By 1958, Doris Duke once again became a frequent visitor to Newport and turned her attention to refurnishing Rough Point. In 1958 and 1959 she began purchasing art and antiques for the house and combined these new pieces with family treasures. It became one of Doris Duke's favorite residences; she lived there May through November most years and continued to collect items for the house during her wide-ranging travels.

In 1966, the most controversial event in Duke's entire life occurred at the estate. She and her interior designer, Eduardo Tirella, were leaving Rough Point in a station wagon. When Tirella left the car to open the front gates to the estate, Duke slid over to the driver's seat to pull the car out of the gates and wait for Tirella to close them again. Accidentally accelerating the station wagon, Duke caught Tirella with the car and dragged him across the street where he was crushed against a tree, instantly killing him. Duke was not charged, and Tirella's death was recorded as an accident. Due to the suspicious nature of the case, the Newport Police Department is going to do a follow-up.

During Hurricane Bob in 1991, the house's solarium served as a shelter for Princess and Baby, Duke's two pet Bactrian camels. The camels were gifts from billionaire Saudi arms-dealer and businessman Adnan Khashoggi. The camels summered in Newport when Duke was in residence. She would often buy them peanut butter cookies in large quantities as treats. Many visitors on the cliff walk were very surprised to see Princess and Baby roaming the grounds.

Rough Point maintains a clever mixture of grandeur and hominess that others lack. The house has stayed how Doris Duke left it since her death in 1993. The architectural significance of Rough Point can be attributed to Trumbauer's ability to renovate and enlarge the original structure in a seamless manner. Doris was one of several remaining Gilded Age socialite heiresses in Newport. While under the ownership of Doris Duke, the house was filled with hundreds of priceless antiques, while the drapes on her bed were bought at JC Penney. Paintings in the home include Gainsborough, Van Dyck, and Renoir.

During Doris Duke's stays, staff at Rough Point would pick vegetables daily for use in the cooking. Vegetables and flowers were shipped from the greenhouses at Duke Farms in New Jersey each spring to be planted. A historical plant list of what was at Rough Point includes artichoke, squash, cabbage, lettuce, onions, peppers, spinach, eggplant, beans, okra and cucumbers. The list of herbs is long, too, including basil, chamomile, chives, dill, fennel, marjoram, parsley, rosemary, sage, thyme, spearmint, tarragon, borage, and lovage.

=== Today ===
The property remained with Duke until her death in 1993. It was tied up in litigation for a few years and opened to the public as a museum in 2000. It is currently owned by the Newport Restoration Foundation. Tours occur from April until November. Since 2003, an exhibit has been in place, being either clothing, jewelry, silver, or furniture, changing each year.

== See also ==
- List of Gilded Age mansions
