= The Shawshank Redemption (disambiguation) =

The Shawshank Redemption is a 1994 American drama film starring Tim Robbins and Morgan Freeman based on the Stephen King story.

The Shawshank Redemption may also refer to:

- The Shawshank Redemption (soundtrack), soundtrack to the 1994 film
- The Shawshank Redemption (play), a 2009 dramatic stageplay
- The Shawshank Redemption/Angola 3, a 2010 album by Bishop Lamont

== See also ==
- Rita Hayworth and Shawshank Redemption, a Stephen King novella upon which the film is based
- Shawshank State Prison, a fictional prison created by Stephen King
- Shawshank tree, a white oak tree featured in the film
