= The Shawshank Redemption (soundtrack) =

Film score by Thomas Newman
- Released: September 20, 1994; May 24, 2016 (expanded edition)
- Recorded: 1994
- Genre: Classical
- Length: 53:24; 112:44 (expanded edition)
- Label: Epic; La-La Land Records (expanded edition)
- Producer: Thomas Newman, Bill Bernstein

Thomas Newman chronology
| Little Women (1994) | The Shawshank Redemption (1994) | The War (1994) |

Professional ratings
Review scores
| Source | Rating |
|---|---|
| Allmusic | 3/5 stars |
| Filmtracks | 4/5 stars |
| SoundtrackNet | 5/5 stars |

The Shawshank Redemption is the original soundtrack of the 1994 film The Shawshank Redemption starring Morgan Freeman, Tim Robbins, Bob Gunton, William Sadler, Clancy Brown, and others.

The original score was composed by Thomas Newman, performed by the Hollywood Studio Symphony and released via the Epic Soundtrax label on September 20, 1994.

== Track listing ==
| No. | Title | Writer(s) | Length |
|---|---|---|---|
| 1. | "May" | Thomas Newman | 0:33 |
| 2. | "Shawshank Prison (Stoic Theme)" | Newman | 1:53 |
| 3. | "New Fish" | Newman | 1:50 |
| 4. | "Rock Hammer" | Newman | 1:51 |
| 5. | "An Inch of His Life" | Newman | 2:48 |
| 6. | "If I Didn't Care" | The Ink Spots | 3:03 |
| 7. | "Brooks was Here" | Newman | 5:06 |
| 8. | "His Judgement Cometh" | Newman | 2:00 |
| 9. | "Suds on the Roof" | Newman | 1:36 |
| 10. | "Workfield" | Newman | 1:10 |
| 11. | "Shawshank Redemption" | Newman | 4:26 |
| 12. | "Lovesick Blues" | Hank Williams | 2:42 |
| 13. | "Elmo Blatch" | Newman | 1:08 |
| 14. | "Sisters" | Newman | 1:18 |
| 15. | "Zihuatanejo" | Newman | 4:05 |
| 16. | "The Marriage of Figaro: Duettino - Sull'aria" (performed by Edith Mathis, Gundula Janowitz, Orchestra of the Deutsche Oper Berlin, Karl Böhm) | Wolfgang Amadeus Mozart | 3:32 |
| 17. | "Lovely Raquel" | Newman | 1:55 |
| 18. | "And That Right Soon" | Newman | 1:08 |
| 19. | "Compass and Guns" | Newman | 3:53 |
| 20. | "So was Red" | Newman | 2:44 |
| 21. | "End Title" | Newman | 2:44 |

== Expanded edition track listing ==
A 2-disc expanded edition was released by La-La Land Records on May 24, 2016.

Disc 1

1. Main Title/Courtroom (5:12)
2. Shawshank Prison (Stoic Theme) (1:54)
3. Prison Entrance (:57)
4. New Fish (1:53)
5. Bogs’ Shower (1:24)
6. Rock Hammer (2:01)
7. First Rape (1:10)
8. Sisters (1:20)
9. May [Extended Version] (:59)
10. Suds On The Roof (1:38)
11. Carves Names (1:03)
12. An Inch Of His Life [Film Version] (2:57)
13. Horse Apple [Extended Version] (2:12)
14. Bible (:55)
15. Letters/Taxes 1:58
16. Brooks Was Here [Extended Version] (5:02)
17. Hope/Gift Exchange (2:38)
18. Lovely Raquel (1:58)
19. Elmo Blatch (1:14)
20. Kid Passed/Wild Injuns (2:07)
21. Zihuatanejo (4:49)
22. Longest Night (1:58)
23. And That Right Soon (1:16)
24. Escape (1:40)
25. Shawshank Redemption [Film Version] (4:31)
26. His Judgement Cometh (2:04)
27. Pacific/Graveyard (2:09)
28. Compass And Guns [Film Version] (5:37)
29. So Was Red (2:45)
30. End Title (4:11)

Disc 2

1. Shawshank Prison (Stoic Theme) [Alternate] (1:58)
2. An Inch Of His Life [Album Version] (2:50)
3. Hope [Alternate] (:55)
4. Lovely Raquel [Alternate] (1:58)
5. Kid Passed [Alternate] (1:00)
6. And That Right Soon [Alternate] 1:16
7. Shawshank Redemption [Album Version] 4:31
8. His Judgement Cometh [Alternate] 2:02
9. Pacific/Graveyard [Alternate] 2:11
10. Compass And Guns [Extended Version] 5:35
11. So Was Red [Alternate] 2:47
12. End Title [Alternate Take] 4:18
13. "If I Didn't Care" by the Ink Spots (3:05)
14. "The Marriage of Figaro: Duettino - Sull'aria" performed by Edith Mathis, Gundula Janowitz, Orchestra of the Deutsche Oper Berlin, Karl Böhm (dir.) (3:38)
15. "Lovesick Blues" by Hank Williams (2:48)

== Credits ==
- Artwork – Castle Rock Entertainment
- Original score composed and conducted by – Thomas Newman
- Performed by – The Hollywood Studio Symphony
- Photography by – Castle Rock Entertainment
- Produced by – Bill Bernstein, Thomas Newman

== Recognition ==
The score was nominated for the Academy Award for Best Original Score and the Grammy Award for Best Instrumental Composition Written for a Motion Picture or for Television, losing the former to The Lion King and the latter to Schindler's List.
