= The Farm (Bromfield novel) =

1933 novel by Louis Bromfield

- Author: Louis Bromfield
- Language: English
- Genre: Novel
- Publication date: 1933
- Publication place: United States
- Pages: 346
- OCLC: 3209963

The Farm is a 1933 novel by Louis Bromfield. Written just before Bromfield's return from decades of living and writing in Europe, the novel reflects the agrarian interests that would dominate the author's thinking during the last two decades of his life. David Anderson describes it as Bromfield's best work but one, like many after the author's early successes, too little appreciated. "The unfair criticisms of the early 1930s have discouraged later critics from looking at his work clearly and coherently," he argues.

== Plot summary ==
The Farm traces several generations of a family’s life on and around a fine piece of land in the Western Reserve, early nineteenth-century Ohio. From the time of “The Colonel,” the patriarch of the MacDougal family, who first claimed the property, to the novel’s present, the 1930s, and the family's last owner of the property, Johnny, the Colonel's great grandson, Bromfield traces the interactions between the MacDougals, their neighbours, the nearby town, and the land itself.

Throughout the novel, Bromfield suggests the corrosive effects of a mercantile and industrial economy upon the Jeffersonian ideal of an agrarian society.

Although the novel ends in the family selling off the farm to a developer who then leases it to less-than-caring tenants, its concern for the land continued as Bromfield returned to the United States and made Malabar Farm a model of sustainable agriculture.

== Legacy ==
In 41: A Portrait of My Father, former United States president George W. Bush recounts that his father, former president George H. W. Bush and his mother, former first lady Barbara Bush, read The Farm and considered becoming farmers shortly after they graduated from college.
