= Gundula Janowitz =

Austrian lyric soprano (born 1937)

- Born: 2 August 1937 (age 88); Berlin, Germany
- Occupation: Soprano singer
- Years active: 1959–1997
- Organisation: Vienna State Opera
- Title: Kammersängerin
- Awards: Austrian Decoration for Science and Art

Gundula Janowitz (born 2 August 1937) is an Austrian lyric soprano singer of operas, oratorios, lieder, and concerts. She is one of the most renowned opera singers of the 20th century and was pre-eminent in the 1960s and 1970s.

== Career ==
Janowitz was born in Berlin, Germany, but grew up in Graz, Austria, where she became a naturalised Austrian. She studied at the Graz Conservatory in Austria, and had already begun to sing at the highest level by the end of the 1950s (Haydn's The Creation, with Herbert von Karajan in 1960). In 1959, Karajan engaged her as Barbarina in Mozart's The Marriage of Figaro at the Vienna State Opera, of which she became a permanent member in 1962.

During the 1960s and 1970s, Janowitz became one of the most popular singers in her field internationally and she developed a comprehensive discography of works ranging from Bach to Richard Strauss. Those eminent conductors with whom she performed included Karajan, but also Otto Klemperer, Eugen Jochum, Leonard Bernstein, Rafael Kubelík, Karl Böhm, Georg Solti, and Carlos Kleiber.

One of the emphases of Janowitz's work was the development of song recitals, which she gave several times at the Salzburg Festival. Following her vocal career, she was active as a vocal teacher. In 1990, she temporarily took over the position of Opera Director in Graz.

Janowitz appeared on many of the great stages of the world, including the Glyndebourne Festival Opera, the Bayreuth Festival, the Salzburg Easter Festival, the Metropolitan Opera, the Paris Opera, La Scala and the Royal Opera House. In 1980, she sang the part of the Countess in a now legendary new production of The Marriage of Figaro (with Georg Solti as conductor, Giorgio Strehler as director and Ezio Frigerio as set designer). Her recording of Schubert's Lieder for female voice has been twice awarded Germany's Deutscher Schallplattenpreis.

Janowitz's farewell to the operatic stage was on 18 May 1990, at the Vienna State Opera in the title role of Ariadne auf Naxos (with Heinrich Hollreiser as conductor, and Filippo Sanjust as director and designer). She kept singing Lieder recitals until 1997, when she completely retired from performing. As well as being an honorary member of the Vienna State Opera and of the Academy of Music in Graz, she was appointed an honorary member of the Royal Academy of Music in London in 2000.

== Voice and repertory ==
Janowitz's voice is recognizable by its pure, "creamy" tone, and rapid vibrato. Like her predecessor Maria Stader, who had a similar timbre to hers, and like her contemporary, Elizabeth Harwood, Janowitz mastered first and foremost the high and middle register and lyrical-emotional expression. She occasionally appeared in dramatic roles (Sieglinde, Leonore, Elsa) and comic roles (Marzelline, Rosalinde), but was most highly regarded for her appearances in full lyric soprano roles like Fiordiligi, Countess Rosina Almaviva, Pamina, Agathe, Arabella, Ariadne, and Countess Madeleine, as well as for her sacred music performances (the Angel Gabriel, The Creation). Of her interpretation of Four Last Songs by Richard Strauss, David Bowie wrote: "Although Eleanor Steber and Lisa Della Casa do fine interpretations of this monumental work, Janowitz’s performance [...] has been described, rightly, as transcendental. It aches with love for a life that is quietly fading. I know of no other piece of music, nor any performance, which moves me quite like this." With a few exceptions, she avoided foreign-language roles (although recordings exist of her singing Don Carlos and Verdi's Requiem and all three Mozart/DaPonte operas in Italian). An excerpt of her portrayal of the Figaro Countess in the duettino "Canzonetta sull'aria" with Swiss soprano Edith Mathis features prominently in the 1994 film The Shawshank Redemption.

== Selected discography ==
- With Otto Klemperer: The Magic Flute
- With Herbert von Karajan: The Creation, The Seasons, Die Walküre, Götterdämmerung, St Matthew Passion, Mass in B minor, Fidelio (as Marzelline), Ninth Symphony, Missa solemnis, A German Requiem, Four Last Songs
- With Bernard Haitink, Four Last Songs
- With Leonard Bernstein: Fidelio (as Leonore)
- With Eugen Jochum: Carmina Burana
- With Carlos Kleiber: Der Freischütz
- With Karl Böhm: Così fan tutte, The Marriage of Figaro, Die Fledermaus, The Seasons, Capriccio
- With Jeffrey Tate: Don Giovanni (as Donna Elvira)
- With Rafael Kubelík: Die Meistersinger von Nürnberg, Lohengrin
- With Rudolf Kempe: Ariadne auf Naxos
- With Karl Richter: Christmas Oratorio, Messiah, Orfeo ed Euridice
- With Hans Knappertsbusch: Parsifal (1962, as Flower Girl)
- With Helmut Koch: Judas Maccabaeus
- With Ferdinand Leitner: Armida
- With Wilfried Boettcher: Mozart: Concert Arias, Georg Philipp Telemann: Ino (Dramatic Cantata)
- Lieder by Franz Schubert, with Charles Spencer (piano)
- Lieder by Franz Schubert, with Irwin Gage (piano). Includes "Gretchen am Spinnrade", "Die Männer sind méchant", and "Der Hirt auf dem Felsen"
- Das Marienleben, Op.27, by Paul Hindemith, with Irwin Gage (piano).

== Filmography ==
Concerts

- Gundula Janowitz: In Concert (recorded live) (1970, conductor Berislav Klobučar, Video Artists International Inc.)
- Beethoven Symphony No. 9 in D minor, Op.125 "Choral" (1968, conductor/director Herbert von Karajan, Unitel Classica)
- Bach Mass in B minor BWV 232 (1969, conductor Karl Richter; director Arne Arbom, Unitel Classica)
- Mozart Requiem K.626 (1971, conductor Karl Böhm; director Hugo Käch, Unitel Classica)
- Brahms Ein Deutsches Requiem, op.45 (1978, conductor/director Herbert von Karajan, Unitel Classica)

Operas

- Così fan tutte (1969, conductor Karl Böhm; director Václav Kašlík, Unitel Classica)
- Die Fledermaus (1972, conductor Karl Böhm; director Otto Schenk, Unitel Classica)
- Arabella (1977, conductor Sir Georg Solti; director Otto Schenk, Unitel Classica)
- Fidelio (1977, conductor Zubin Mehta; director Pierre Jourdan, Gaumont Distribution)
- Ariadne auf Naxos (1978, conductor, Karl Böhm; director John Vernon, Unitel Classica)
- Fidelio (1978, conductor, Leonard Bernstein; director Otto Schenk, Deutsche Grammophon)

== Decorations and awards ==
- Kammersängerin (Austria, 1969; Berlin, 1974)
- 1978 Joseph Marx Music Prize of the State of Styria
- 2000 Austrian Cross of Honour for Science and Art, 1st class
- 2003 Gold Medal for services to the City of Vienna
- Grand Gold Decoration of Styria
- 2019 Hugo-Wolf-Award
