= Early Autumn =

1926 novel by Louis Bromfield

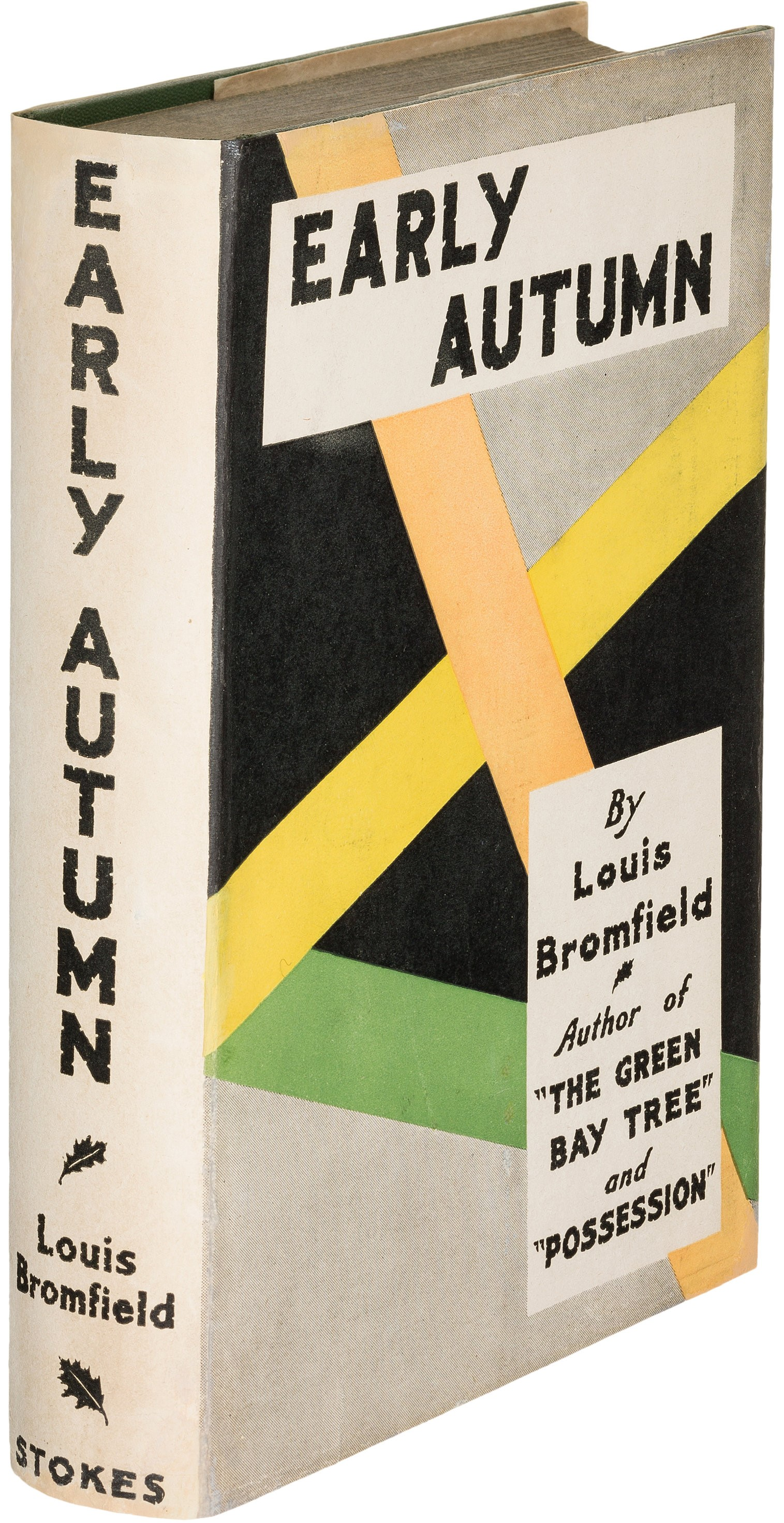
- 1st Edition Cover
- Author: Louis Bromfield
- Publisher: Triangle Books
- Publication date: 1926
- Text: Early Autumn at Wikisource

Early Autumn is a 1926 novel by Louis Bromfield. It won the Pulitzer Prize for the Novel in 1927. In 1956, producer Benedict Bogeaus announced that he was adapting the book into a film to be titled "Conquest," but the film was never made.

Early Autumn was the third installment in a series of four novels called Escape.

== Synopsis ==
The novel is set in the fictional Massachusetts town of Durham shortly after World War I. The Pentland family is rich and part of the upper class, but their world is rapidly changing. The old Congregational church the Pentlands long favored has disbanded as more and more WASPs have left Durham, replaced by immigrant Roman Catholics with different religious customs. The Pentlands once ruled upper-class society in Durham. However, upper-class society is changing: Many of the "old line" families have either died off or moved away, and many nouveaux riches have moved into the area who do not share the same old-fashioned values and observe the same old-fashioned norms of behavior that the Pentlands do.

The patriarch of the family is John Pentland. He lives in Pentland Manor, a large and old-fashioned manor house, with his sister Cassie, a fussy, moralistic, snobbish old maid who is firmly determined to see that the Pentlands uphold the "old ways." Her companion is Miss Peavey, who lacks intelligence but in all other ways is as moralistic and disapproving as Aunt Cassie. John's son and heir Anson married the wealthy but low-status Scotch-Irish girl Olivia. The couple have a son, John (nicknamed "Jack"), and a daughter, Sybil. The Pentlands say that they can trace their family heritage to the founding of the Massachusetts Bay Colony, and Anson is writing a book about the family. John Pentland's niece Sabine is the black sheep of the family. Her parents died, and her home was lost to creditors. She became Aunt Cassie's ward. However, 20 years ago, she married a poor, low-born man named Callender and fled with him to Europe. John Pentland acts as if he is widowed, but about a quarter of the way through the novel the reader realizes that his wife is not dead. For the past two or three decades, Pentland's wife Agnes has been insane, and she now lives in an upstairs room in a far wing of the house. She is cared for by Miss Egan, a nurse. Every morning, John Pentland visits her and speaks with her despite her insanity. Afterward, he visits Mrs. Soames, a long-time friend of his wife, and plays cards. His attention to the widowed Mrs. Soames is unseemly (so Aunt Cassie says), but no one can criticize him openly because John is the patriarch of the family.

The novel is set during the early autumn. Olivia is almost age 40, and she increasingly feels trapped and stifled by her life. She and her husband have a loveless marriage (they have not shared rooms for years), and their son Jack is constantly ill. The novel opens as Olivia's daughter Sybil returns home from a boarding school in Paris. Sabine Callender and her daughter Therese have returned to Durham, and they are spending the summer at Pentland Manor. Therese is a débutante, and she is being "introduced" to Durham upper-class society. Aunt Cassie and Miss Peavey repeatedly criticize Sabine for being a flapper and for the scandal she brought on the family. Also visiting Durham that fall is Jean, the son of a Frenchman who married an American woman and whom Sybil met in Paris. Sybil is in love with Jean, and she creates scandal by pursuing him relentlessly.

Also newly arrived in Durham is Michael O'Hara, an Irish immigrant who has achieved wealth and political prominence in Boston. He bought Sabine's former home, and he is refurbishing it. Aunt Cassie and Miss Peavey are horrified by the arriviste and constantly snub him. Anson is upset by the attentions O'Hara lavishes on his wife and daughter. O'Hara soon tells Sabine that he has fallen in love with Olivia, and Olivia reciprocates. O'Hara says he is willing to sacrifice everything just to love her. Anson Pentland refuses to give Olivia a divorce for fear it will ruin his career and the family's good name.

Several events happen in quick succession: Jack dies, but only Olivia is there to comfort him at the end. Olivia discovers the Pentland groom is having a secret affair with someone in the house. (The reader realizes it is Miss Egan.) The night Jack dies, Olivia runs into a momentarily lucid Mrs. Pentland, who tells her that there is a secret in the attic that could destroy and free the family. She is quickly hushed by Miss Egan, and she soon falls back into muddled incomprehensibility. Sybil marries Jean, and Olivia is convinced her daughter will find the happiness that she never had.

Several secrets are revealed by the end of the novel, which mark the Pentlands as hypocrites. Olivia learns that John Pentland loves Mrs. Soames (whether he has consummated his affair with her is unclear), and he has not divorced his insane wife out of duty. His daily visits with his wife are not performed out of love (as everyone assumes) but out of a desire to divert attention from his affair with Mrs. Soames. Olivia comes to believe that Mrs. Pentland's ravings about a secret in the attic were not madness. She soon discovers a packet of letters that reveals that the Pentland family's ancestor was a bastard child who stole the name from an aristocratic family that had died shortly after arriving in the New World. She suspects that Anson knows the truth and that he is lying about the family in his book.

John Pentland, broken-hearted at the death of his grandson, changes his will and leaves all his money to Olivia. He commits suicide by riding his horse into a deep ravine and falling to his death. Olivia rejects Michael O'Hara's love, realizing that she is the only person strong enough to hold the Pentland family together through the coming years of immense change. John Pentland has given her the chance, through her control of the family fortune, to force the Pentlands to adapt rather than wither like so many other upper-class families have. By leaving with Michael, Olivia believes that she would be taking the easy way out and cheapening herself.
