= Sull'aria ... che soave zeffiretto =

Aria from Mozart's opera The Marriage of Figaro

"Sull'aria ... che soave zeffiretto" (On the breeze ... What a gentle little Zephyr) is a duettino, or a short duet, from act 3, no. 21, of Wolfgang Amadeus Mozart's 1786 opera The Marriage of Figaro, K. 492, to a libretto by Lorenzo Da Ponte. In the duettino, Countess Almaviva (a soprano) dictates to Susanna (also a soprano) the invitation to a tryst addressed to the countess' husband in a plot to expose his infidelity.

== Music ==
Range
Susanna	Contessa

Sull'aria...che soave zeffiretto
Maria Stader (Countess), Irmgard Seefried, (Susanna), Deutsches Symphonie-Orchester Berlin, Ferenc Fricsay (1960)

The duet is scored for oboe, bassoon, and strings. The piece is in the key of B-flat major with a time signature of 6/8 and 62 bars long; the tempo indication is allegretto. During the first part of the duet (bars 1–37), the Contessa dictates the title and the three lines of the letter and, after a pause, Susanna repeats the lines as she writes them. In the second part, Contessa and Susanna read alternate lines slightly overlapping (bars 38–45) until they finish in a true duet with their conclusion. The duet has a vocal range from F_{4} to B♭_{5} for Susanna and from D_{4} to G_{5} for the Contessa.

== Libretto ==
Without repetitions, the text is:

and both conclude:

"Canzonetta sull'aria"
Che soave zeffiretto
Questa sera spirerà
Sotto i pini del boschetto.

Ei già il resto capirà.

"A little song on the breeze" (the title)
What a gentle little Zephyr
This evening will sigh
Under the pines in the little grove.

And the rest he'll understand.

The dialogue, without the re-reading of the letter:

Contessa:	Canzonetta sull'aria...	A little song on the breeze...
Susanna:	Sull'aria...	On the breeze...
Contessa:	Che soave zeffiretto...	What a gentle little Zephyr...
Susanna:	Zeffiretto...	A little Zephyr...
Contessa:	Questa sera spirerà...	This evening will sigh...
Susanna:	Questa sera spirerà...	This evening will sigh...
Contessa:	Sotto i pini del boschetto.	Under the pines in the little grove.
Susanna:	Sotto i pini...	Under the pines...
Contessa:	Sotto i pini del boschetto.	Under the pines in the little grove.
Susanna:	Sotto i pini...del boschetto...	Under the pines...in the little grove....
Contessa:	Ei già il resto capirà.	And the rest he'll understand.
Susanna/ Contessa:	Certo, certo il capirà.	Certainly, certainly he'll understand.

Both then re-read the letter.

== In popular culture ==
In The Shawshank Redemption (1994), prisoner Andy Dufresne (Tim Robbins) defies Warden Sam Norton (Bob Gunton) by playing an excerpt of this song over the prison's public address system. Norton sentences Dufresne to solitary confinement as a result. Ellis Boyd "Red" Redding (Morgan Freeman) remarks in his voice-over narration: "I have no idea to this day what those two Italian ladies were singing about. ... I'd like to think they were singing about something so beautiful it can't be expressed in words, and it makes your heart ache because of it." The duettino, sung by the sopranos Edith Mathis and Gundula Janowitz, appeared in the film's soundtrack. It was nominated as one of 400 songs in consideration for the American Film Institute's list of 100 top movie songs, although it did not win a place on the list.

The video game Lego City Undercover also features the duet in the third chapter of the game's story, when protagonist Chase McCain plays it over the prison's intercom, in a direct parody of the film.
