= Shawshank tree =

Former white oak near Lucas, Ohio, US

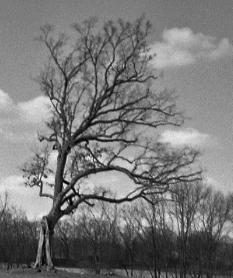
- Shawshank tree in 2013
- Interactive map of Shawshank tree
- Species: White oak (Quercus alba)
- Location: Monroe Township, Richland County, Ohio, U.S.
- Coordinates: 40°39′14″N 82°23′31″W
- Date seeded: c. 1836
- Date felled: July 22, 2016

The Shawshank tree was a white oak located near Malabar Farm State Park in Monroe Township, Richland County, Ohio, United States, near Lucas, that was featured in the 1994 motion picture The Shawshank Redemption. The tree was at least 100 feet (30 m) tall and approximately 180 to 200 years old. It played a central role in the film's plot and was one of the most popular tourist sites connected to it. The tree was split by lightning on July 29, 2011, and was eventually knocked down by strong winds on or around July 22, 2016.

== History ==
The tree was a major tourist attraction for fans of the film, although located on private property at Malabar Farm. It formed part of "The Shawshank Trail" which features many of the film's iconic locations and attracts up to 35,000 visitors annually. The farm where the tree was located is sometimes used as a venue for weddings.

On July 29, 2011, half of the tree fell due to trunk rot from ants after being hit by lightning. News of the event was widely shared, appearing in news outlets in the United Kingdom and India. The tree's fate was uncertain at the time, and officials were pessimistic about its chances of survival, but it was found to be alive. The tree was further damaged in July 2016 due to strong winds. The event caused a major increase in Internet traffic to the Mansfield and Richland County Convention and Visitors Bureau website and general interest in the Shawshank Trail. The remaining portions of the tree were cut down on April 9, 2017, by the property's owner. The remains of the tree were turned into The Shawshank Redemption merchandise including rock hammers and magnets that were first sold during the 2017 Shawshank Hustle, an annual 7k featuring filming sites along the race route.

== Role in film ==
Though the film is set in Maine, much of the filming took place in Mansfield, Ohio, and nearby locations. The oak appears near the end of The Shawshank Redemption when Red (played by Morgan Freeman) follows clues left by Andy Dufresne (played by Tim Robbins) to its location. Red finds a box buried at the base of a stone wall in the shade of the oak. The box contains a letter from Andy and cash to buy a bus ticket to join him in Mexico. In the film, Andy describes the tree as "like something out of a Robert Frost poem".

The oak has been described as among the most iconic trees in film history.
