= Louis Bromfield =

American author and conservationist (1896–1956)

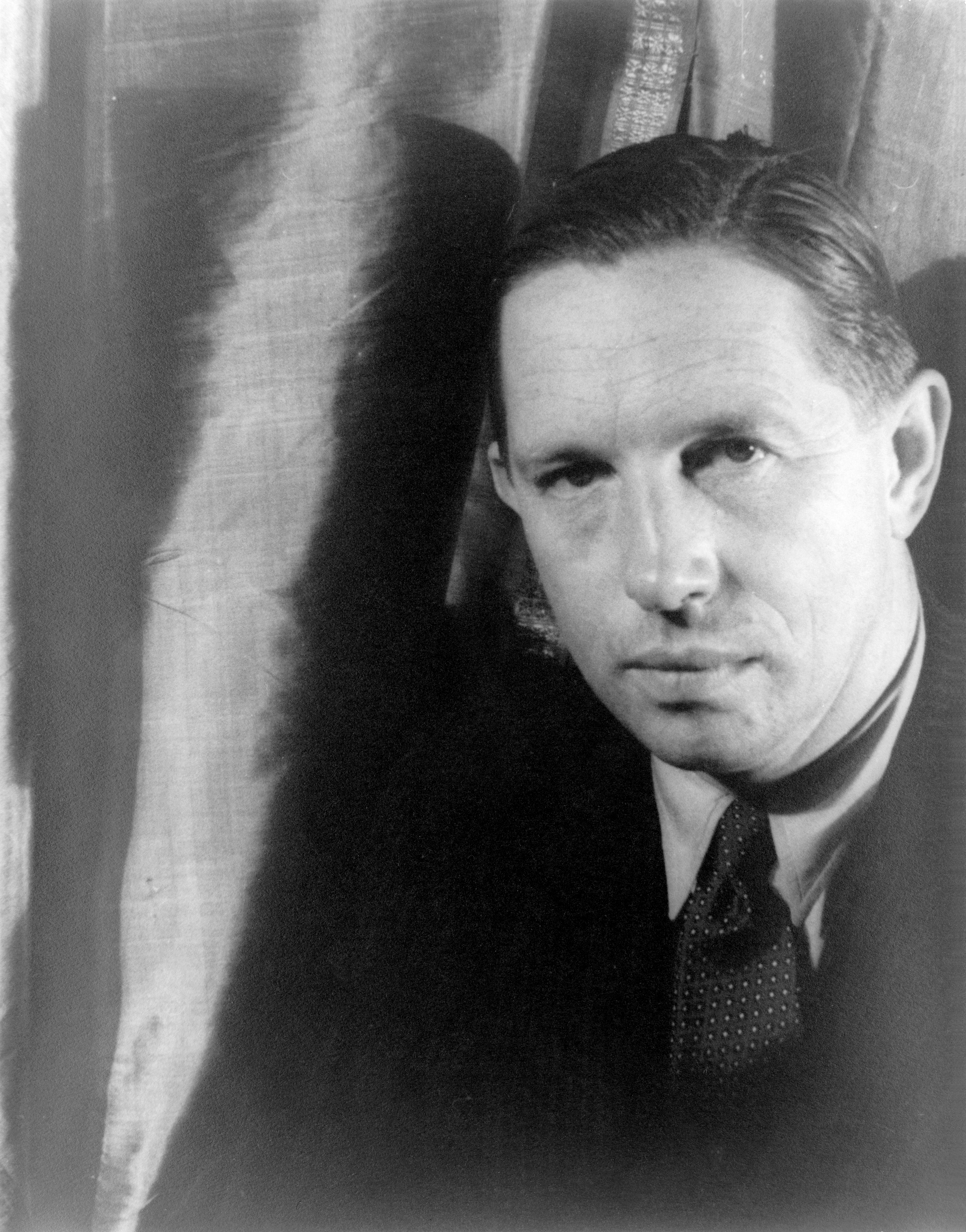
- Bromfield photographed in 1933 by Carl Van Vechten
- Born: December 27, 1896; Mansfield, Ohio, U.S.
- Died: March 18, 1956 (aged 59); Columbus, Ohio, U.S.
- Education: Cornell University; Columbia University
- Occupations: Writer, conservationist
- Awards: Pulitzer Prize for the Novel (1927)

Louis Bromfield (December 27, 1896 – March 18, 1956) was an American writer and conservationist. A bestselling novelist in the 1920s, he reinvented himself as a farmer in the late 1930s and became one of the earliest proponents of sustainable and organic agriculture in the United States. He won the Pulitzer Prize for the Novel in 1927 for Early Autumn, founded the experimental Malabar Farm near Mansfield, Ohio, and played an important role in the early environmental movement.

== Early life and education ==
Lewis Brumfield was born in Mansfield, Ohio, in 1896 to Charles Brumfield, a bank cashier and real estate speculator, and Annette Marie Coulter Brumfield, the daughter of an Ohio farmer. (Brumfield later changed the spelling of his name to "Louis Bromfield" because he thought it looked more distinguished.)

As a boy, Bromfield loved working on his grandfather's farm. In 1914, he enrolled in Cornell University to study agriculture. Yet his family's deteriorating financial situation forced him to drop out after only one semester. Deeply in debt, his parents sold their house in central Mansfield and moved to Bromfield's grandfather's farm on the outskirts of town.

== Career ==
From 1915 to 1916, Bromfield struggled to revive the unproductive family farm, an experience he later wrote about bitterly in his autobiographical novel The Farm. In 1916, he enrolled in Columbia University to study journalism, where he was initiated into the fraternal organization Phi Delta Theta. His time at Columbia was brief; he left after less than a year to volunteer in World War I with the American Field Service.

Bromfield served in Section 577 of the U.S. Army Ambulance Corps and was attached to the French infantry. He saw major action during the Ludendorff Offensive and the 100 Days Offensive and was briefly captured by the German army in the summer of 1918. Though he later claimed to have been awarded the Croix de Guerre, there is no evidence of this decoration in French or American military records.

Bromfield was discharged from the army in 1919. He found work in New York City as a journalist, critic and publicity manager, among other jobs. In 1921, he married the socialite Mary Appleton Wood during a small ceremony near her family home in Ipswich, Massachusetts. They had three daughters, Ann Bromfield (1925–2001), Hope Bromfield (1927–2016) and Ellen Bromfield (1932–2019).

In 1924, Bromfield published his first novel, The Green Bay Tree, which featured a headstrong, independent female protagonist — a feature that recurred in many of his later books. A second novel, Possession, was published in 1925. Stuart Sherman, John Farrar and other leading critics of the day praised the quality of his early fiction.

=== Paris and Hollywood ===
In November 1925, Bromfield moved to Paris, where he became associated with many of the central figures of the Lost Generation, especially Gertrude Stein and Ernest Hemingway. His third novel, Early Autumn, a harsh portrait of his wife's Puritan New England background, won the 1927 Pulitzer Prize. “He is, of all the young American novelists, pre-eminently the best and most vital,” John Carter wrote that year in the New York Times.

Bromfield continued to write best-selling novels in the late 1920s and early 1930s, including A Good Woman, The Strange Case of Miss Annie Spraag and The Farm, an autobiographical novel that romanticized his family's agrarian past. He also worked briefly in Hollywood as a contract screenwriter for Samuel Goldwyn.

=== Senlis and India ===
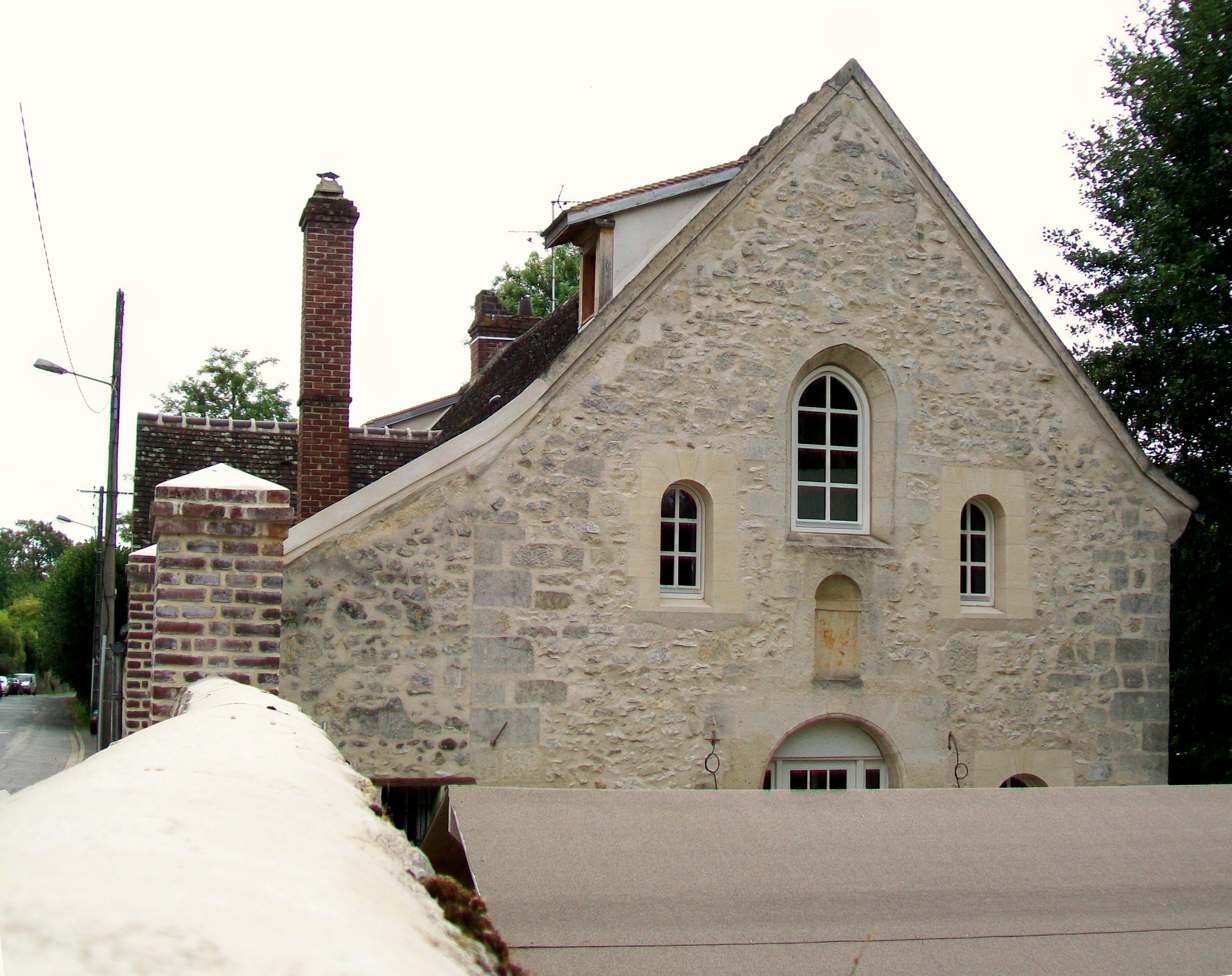
Senlis, Ancienne église Saint-Étienne, façade ouest, rue Saint-Étienne

In 1930, he moved into a renovated 16th-century rectory, the Presbytère St-Etienne, in Senlis, north of Paris. There he built an elaborate garden on the banks of the River Nonette, where he hosted parties that were well known among artists, writers and socialites of the period. Regular guests included Gertrude Stein, Alice B. Toklas, Elsa Schiaparelli, Dolly Wilde, Leslie Howard, Noël Haskins Murphy, Douglas Fairbanks, Sir Francis Cyril Rose, F. Scott and Zelda Fitzgerald. Janet Flanner, who was a frequent witness to the weekly gatherings at Bromfield's Senlis estate, once said that Bromfield "collected people (and noted their value) the way some men do stamps."

Bromfield's passion for horticulture increased over the course of the 1930s. He learned techniques of intensive gardening from his peasant neighbors in Senlis and formed a close bond with Edith Wharton, who designed the formal gardens at the Pavillon Colombe, her estate in nearby Saint-Brice-Sous-Fôret.

During this period, Bromfield also made two long trips to India. He visited Sir Albert Howard’s soil institute in the state of Indore (where Bromfield was exposed to early organic farming methods) and spent time in Baroda City (present-day Vadodara) as a guest of Sayajirao Gaekwad III, the Maharajah of Baroda. His travels informed one of his most critically acclaimed bestsellers, The Rains Came (1937), which was adapted into a popular 1939 film starring Myrna Loy and Tyrone Power. He later used proceeds from this book to finance Malabar Farm, saying that “nothing could be more appropriate than giving the farm an Indian name because India made it possible.”

At the end of the Spanish Civil War, Bromfield served as the chairman of the Paris-based Emergency Committee for American Wounded, which helped repatriate volunteers who had fought in the Abraham Lincoln Brigades. He later received the French Legion of Honor for this effort. An outspoken critic of Neville Chamberlain’s policy of appeasement (most notably in the 1939 book England, Dying Oligarchy), he left Europe shortly after the Munich Agreement with a hazy plan to move to Ohio and raise his children on an “honest-to-God farm.”

=== Malabar Farm and the Friends of the Land ===
In December 1938, Bromfield purchased 600 acres of worn-out farmland near the town of Lucas in Pleasant Valley, Richland County, Ohio. He built a 19-room Greek Revival-style farmhouse that he dubbed the Big House. Using expertise and labor from New Deal agencies like the Soil Conservation Service and Civilian Conservation Corps, Bromfield rehabilitated his land and in the process learned the principles of soil conservation. He later turned Malabar into a showcase for what he called the “New Agriculture.” Among the novel farming techniques that he promoted at Malabar were the use of green manures, contour plowing, “trash farming,” sheet composting and strip cropping.

In 1941, Bromfield became first vice president of the Friends of the Land, a new national volunteer organization allied with the U.S. Soil Conservation Service, that sought to correct the ruinous farming practices that had culminated in the Dust Bowl and other incidents of widespread soil erosion in the 1930s. The organization brought together many prominent voices in 20th century ecology and agriculture, including Paul B. Sears, Hugh Hammond Bennett and Aldo Leopold. Bromfield used his celebrity to promote the work of agricultural reformers, including Edward Faulkner, whose 1943 book Plowman’s Folly criticized the moldboard plow and advocated “trash farming” (a forerunner to no-till agriculture) to avoid erosion and maintain soil fertility. Bromfield also helped popularize the organization's journal, The Land, which featured contributions from E.B. White, John Dos Passos, Henry A. Wallace, Aldo Leopold and Rachel Carson, among many others.

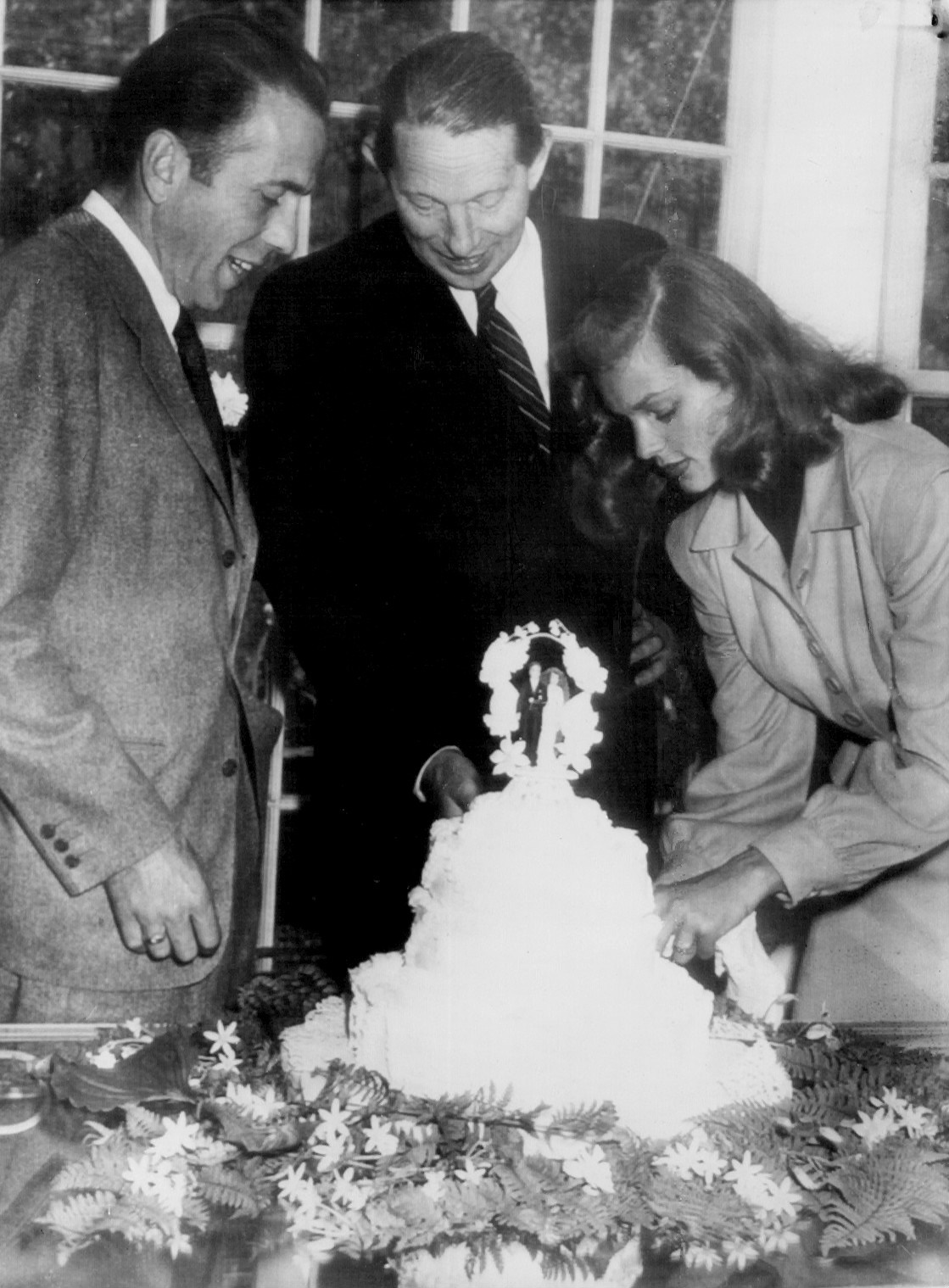
Best man Louis Bromfield (center) at the wedding of Humphrey Bogart and Lauren Bacall at Malabar Farm (May 21, 1945)

Bromfield established Malabar's national reputation in 1945 by hosting the wedding of his good friend Humphrey Bogart to Lauren Bacall. Bromfield served as best man. Malabar was often visited by celebrities, including Kay Francis, Joan Fontaine, Ina Claire, Mayo Methot and James Cagney. E.B. White captured the atmosphere of the farm in a 1948 poem in the New Yorker:

Strangers arriving by every train,

Bromfield terracing against the rain,

Catamounts crying, mowers mowing,

Guest rooms full to overflowing,

Boxers in every room of the house,

Cows being milked to Brahms and Strauss,

Kids arriving by van and pung,

Bromfield up to his eyes in dung,

Sailors, trumpeters, mystics, actors,

All of them wanting to drive the tractors,

All of them eager to husk the corn,

Some of them sipping their drinks till morn […]

=== Decline and death ===
Bromfield's newfound interest in agriculture and environmentalism coincided with a collapse of his literary reputation. Critics like Malcolm Cowley, Orville Prescott and Edmund Wilson dismissed his later fiction as contrived and superficial. Yet Bromfield's books continued to be popular with readers; his 1947 novel Colorado sold more than 1 million copies. He also began writing a series of memoirs about agriculture and the environment, beginning with the best-selling Pleasant Valley (1945).

As Bromfield's literary career faltered, he began to run into major financial difficulties, compounded by the high cost of maintaining his experimental farm and his lavish lifestyle. Among many failed business schemes, he tried to raise capital by creating satellite versions of Malabar in Wichita Falls, Texas and Itatiba, Brazil. After the death of his wife Mary in 1952, he began a relationship with the billionaire heiress Doris Duke, who shared his interest in horticulture and conservation. Bromfield told a newspaper reporter early in 1956 that he and Duke “might get married.” But their romance was cut short because of his deteriorating health. He died of multiple myeloma on March 18, 1956, at the University Hospital in Columbus.

== Influence and legacy ==
After Bromfield's death, Malabar Farm was eventually turned into a state park and tourist attraction. Malabar Farm State Park hosts thousands of annual visitors and maintains some aspects of Bromfield's management philosophy. One of the park's notable features is the Doris Duke Woods, named for Doris Duke, whose donation helped rescue Malabar from development after Bromfield's death.

Many of Bromfield's agricultural writings remain in print. Farmers and environmentalists such as Wendell Berry and Joel Salatin have cited Bromfield as an important influence. In 1989, Louis Bromfield was posthumously elected to the Ohio Agricultural Hall of Fame, and in December 1996, the centennial of his birth, the Ohio Department of Agriculture placed a bust of him in the lobby named for him at the department's new headquarters in Reynoldsburg, Ohio.

Bromfield's youngest daughter Ellen Bromfield Geld continued her father's work in Brazil, where she and her husband Carson Geld moved in 1952. They built a farm, Fazenda Pau d’Alho, and Ellen became a well-known newspaper columnist and author. She died in 2019.

== Works ==
- The Green Bay Tree, 1924
- Possession, 1925
- Early Autumn, 1926 (also at Project Gutenberg).
- A Good Woman, 1927
- The House of Women, 1927 stageplay
- The Work of Robert Nathan, 1927
- The Strange Case of Miss Annie Spragg, 1928
- Awake and Rehearse, 1929
- Tabloid News, 1930
- Twenty-four Hours, 1930
- A Modern Hero, 1932
- The Farm, 1933
- Here Today and Gone Tomorrow, 1934
- The Man Who Had Everything, 1935
- It Had to Happen, 1936
- The Rains Came, 1937
- McLeod's Folly, 1939
- England: A Dying Oligarchy, 1939
- Night in Bombay, 1940
- Wild Is the River, 1941
- Until the Day Break, 1942
- Mrs. Parkington, 1943
- The World We Live In: Stories, 1944
- What Became of Anna Bolton, 1944 (Dutch translation: Wat gebeurde er met Anna Bolton. Den Haag: NBC, 1960)
- Pleasant Valley, 1945
- Bitter Lotus, Cleveland, Ohio: The World Publishing Company, 1945 (German translation by Elisabeth Rotten, Wien, Stuttgart: Humboldt-Verlag, 1941)
- Twenty-four Hours, Zephyr Books Vol.12, Stockholm/London
- A Few Brass Tacks, 1946
- Colorado, 1947
- Kenny, 1947
- Malabar Farm, 1948
- The Wild Country, 1948
- Out of the Earth, 1950
- Mr. Smith, 1951
- The Wealth of the Soil, 1952
- Up Ferguson Way, 1953
- A New Pattern for a Tired World (available online), 1954
- Animals and Other People, 1955
- From My Experience, 1955
- Until the day break ?? (Dutch translation by A. Coster, Den Haag, J. Philip Krusemsn's uitg. mij.)

== See also ==
- List of ambulance drivers during World War I
