= Malabar Farm State Park =

State park in Richland County, Ohio, USA

- Malabar Farm
- U.S. National Register of Historic Places
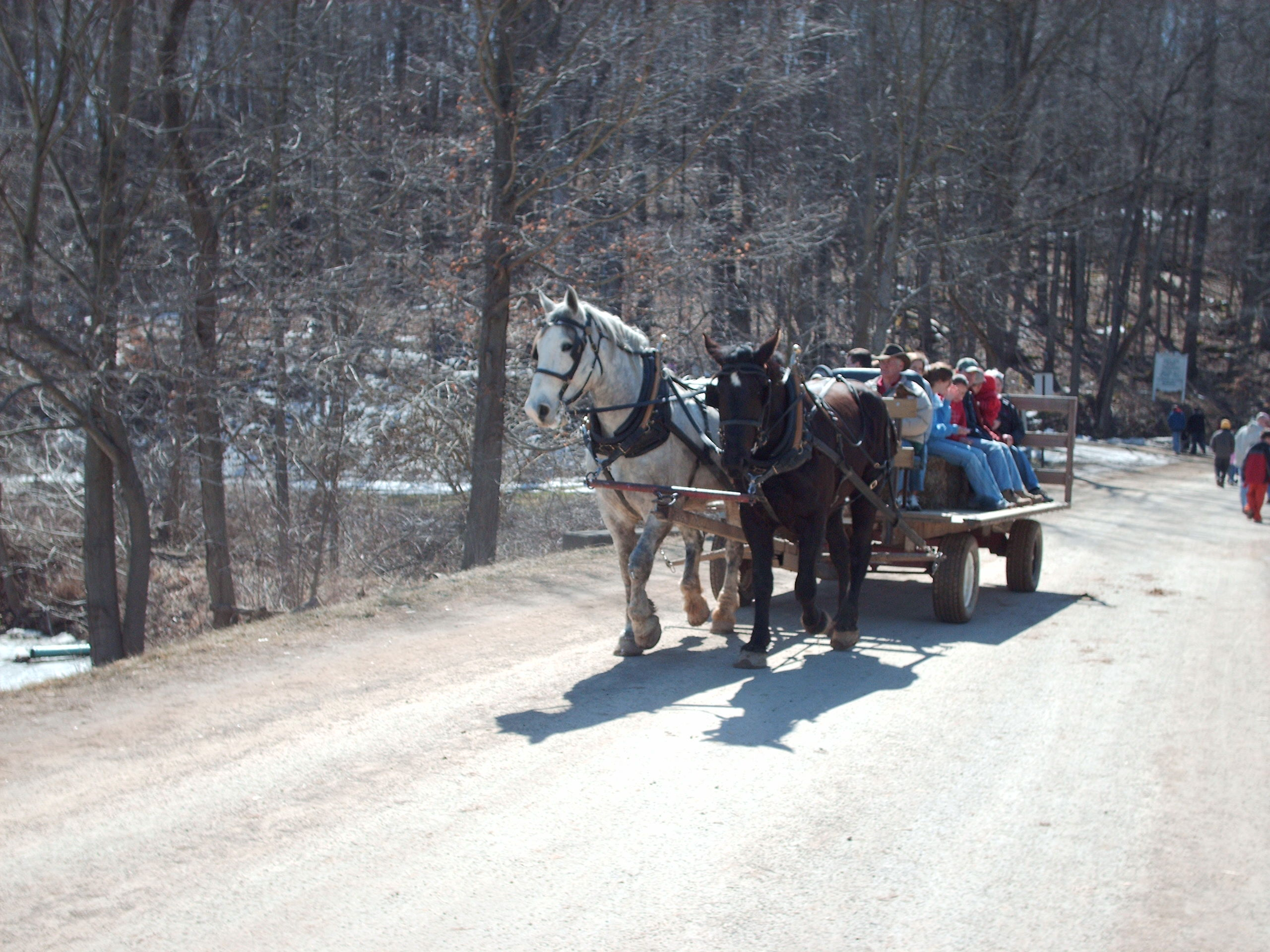
- Horses at the Maple Sugar Festival in 2007.

- Location within Ohio Location within the United States
- Location: Monroe Township, Richland County, at 4050 Bromfield Road, Lucas, Ohio
- Coordinates: 40°38′57″N 82°23′26″W
- Area: 580.6 acres (235.0 ha)
- Built: 1939
- Architect: Louis Lamoreux
- Architectural style: Greek revival style
- NRHP reference No.: 73001520
- Added to NRHP: April 11, 1973

Malabar Farm State Park is a state park in Richland County, Ohio, United States, located near Lucas and the Mohican State Park.

== History ==
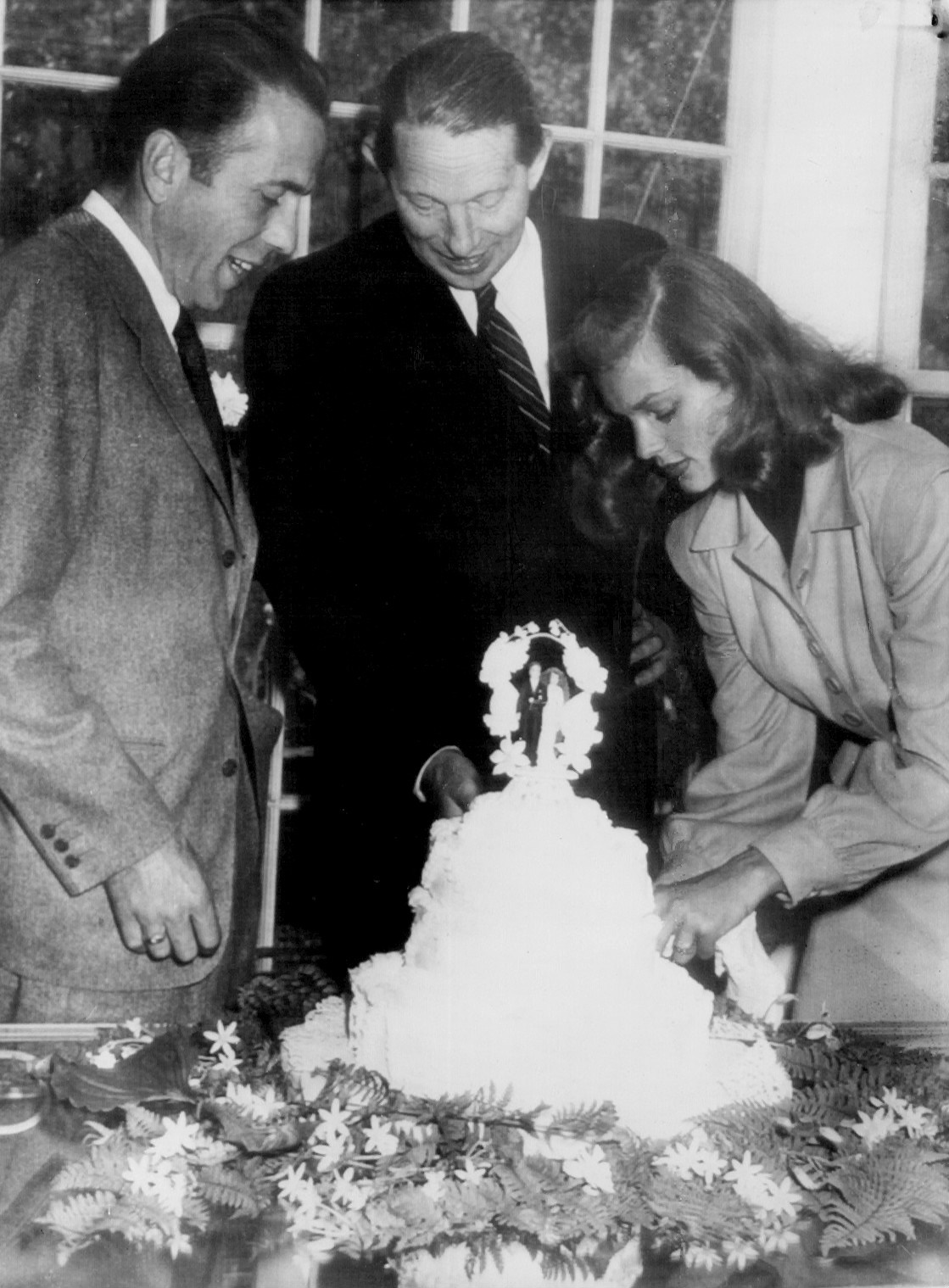
Best man Louis Bromfield (center) at the wedding of Humphrey Bogart and Lauren Bacall at Malabar Farm (May 21, 1945)

Nestled in the hills of Pleasant Valley, Malabar Farm was built in 1939 by Pulitzer Prize-winning author Louis Bromfield and was his home until his death in 1956.

Bromfield grew up in Pleasant Valley. His passion for horticulture developed when he was in France, and it took him on two long trips to India, which were the inspiration for one of his most critically acclaimed bestsellers, The Rains Came (1937). He used the proceeds from the book to finance Malabar Farm, saying that “nothing could be more appropriate than giving the farm an Indian name because India made it possible.”.

On returning to Ohio, he bought a farm from Clement Herring in December 1938, and bought adjacent farms in 1940 and 1941. In all, he owned 580.6 acres (235.0 ha) of land. Bromfield chose architect Louis Lamoreux of Mansfield to help him design and construct a 19-room Greek revival style home, that he dubbed the "Big House". The Bromfield family moved to Pleasant Valley in 1939 and lived in the “Fleming house” until their “Big House” was built. The original Herring house was used as the center of the construction. The Big House was expanded from this focus point and made to look like sections had been added on over the years. Bromfield was constantly ordering changes to rooms and walls. Thus, the project was dragged out for 18 months.

The 32-room Western Reserve-style homestead, where Bromfield wrote many of his books, attracted film stars, artists, politicians, writers, and conservationists annually. As many as 20,000 people visited the farm every year. Sunday tours alone attracted 100 to 200 people. On May 21, 1945, Bromfield hosted Humphrey Bogart and Lauren Bacall's wedding and honeymoon at Malabar Farm. Malabar was often visited by celebrities, including Kay Francis, Joan Fontaine, Ina Claire, Mayo Methot and James Cagney.

The farm spread over 1,000 acres (400 ha) of land. At one point, 200 acres (81 ha) were set aside for apple trees, but they ended up costing Bromfield money. Because of this, he got out of apple production. He also stopped his egg production, as well as his sheep and hog breeding. He chose to focus on beef and dairy. Additionally, Bromfield developed a technique known as conservation farming. This was based on grass farming, which produced large quantities of forage and pasture. Using expertise and labor from New Deal agencies like the Soil Conservation Service and Civilian Conservation Corps, Bromfield rehabilitated his land and in the process learned the principles of soil conservation. He later turned Malabar into a showcase for what he called the “New Agriculture.” Among the novel farming techniques that he promoted at Malabar were the use of green manures, contour plowing, “trash farming,” sheet composting and strip cropping. Malabar Farm became a national model for sustainable agriculture.

In addition to this, Bromfield experimented with composting using manure from livestock on the farm. Square fields were changed to follow the lie of the land so as to discourage erosion. 140 acres (57 ha) were put aside for timber. In 1958, Bromfield's children gave the farm to a conservation foundation—Friends of the Land in lieu of debts Bromfield had incurred. In August 1972, the deed of Malabar Farm was accepted by the state of Ohio after the Louis Bromfield Malabar Farm Foundation—which had been operating the farm—faced foreclosure. In 1976, the farm became a state park. On April 4, 1993, a fire destroyed the main barn. In September 1994, 150 volunteers from the Timber Framers Guild of North America raised a new barn in resemblance of the original.

Hostelling International USA had operated a 19-bed youth hostel for years in a farmhouse that was acquired when Malabar Farm was given to the State of Ohio. This was closed in late 2017 by Hostelling International due to diminished public interest and use after running continuously since 1979. To date the building is unused.

== Points of interest within the Park ==
=== Malabar Farm Inn ===
Malabar Farm Inn is a historic stagecoach inn built in 1820. The two-story brick building was restored as a restaurant, offering home-cooked dining. The Malabar Inn Restaurant has operated sporadically in recent years, having closed in 2018, re-opened in 2021, and closed in July 2023.

Just to the east of the restaurant lies Malabar Spring. In 1946, Louis Bromfield designed a roadside market stand that could use the spring to keep market items cool. Sporadically, visitors could purchase fresh, local produce at the market stand. Under various management philosophies at ODNR, sporadically, visitors could purchase fresh, local produce which is cooled by flowing spring water. The garden market ceased operation upon closure of the Malabar Inn Restaurant in 2018.

=== Pugh Cabin ===
This authentic, rustic log-cabin style home was built in the 1940s by Bromfield's neighbor, Jim Pugh. The cabin was used to film a few of the opening scenes in the 1994 film The Shawshank Redemption.

=== The Ceely Rose House ===
The miller's house, mentioned in the Pleasant Valley collection of ghost stories, was the 19th Century home of a young, mentally challenged girl named Ceely Rose. In 1896, Ceely Rose murdered her three-person family by poisoning their food with arsenic. Annually in October, the Ceely Rose Play is performed in the park's timber frame barn, as part of a ghost story trilogy. The other two plays are Phoebe Wise and Louie. In 2014, an episode of Ghost Hunters was filmed at the Ceely Rose House. The episode, entitled Family Plot, aired on the SyFy channel. The Ghost Hunter's crew investigates claims of paranormal activities stemming from the 1896 triple murder. On this same episode, they also spend time inside Louis Bromfield's "Big House" at Malabar Farm, again trying to document reported paranormal activity.

== Malabar Farm Events ==
=== Maple Sugaring Festival ===
A festival dedicated to early Ohio's winter tradition of making maple syrup. This festival takes place the first two weekends in March. During the sugaring off days, at the farm, learn about the process of harvesting sap from trees, boiling the liquid down to syrup, making candies, sugar, and other sweet treats. There are many activities and demonstrations available with free admission.

=== Heritage Days ===
One of the state's largest outdoor craft shows. The festival includes various living history reenactments, including of the civil war era and buck-skinners.

=== Wagon Tours ===
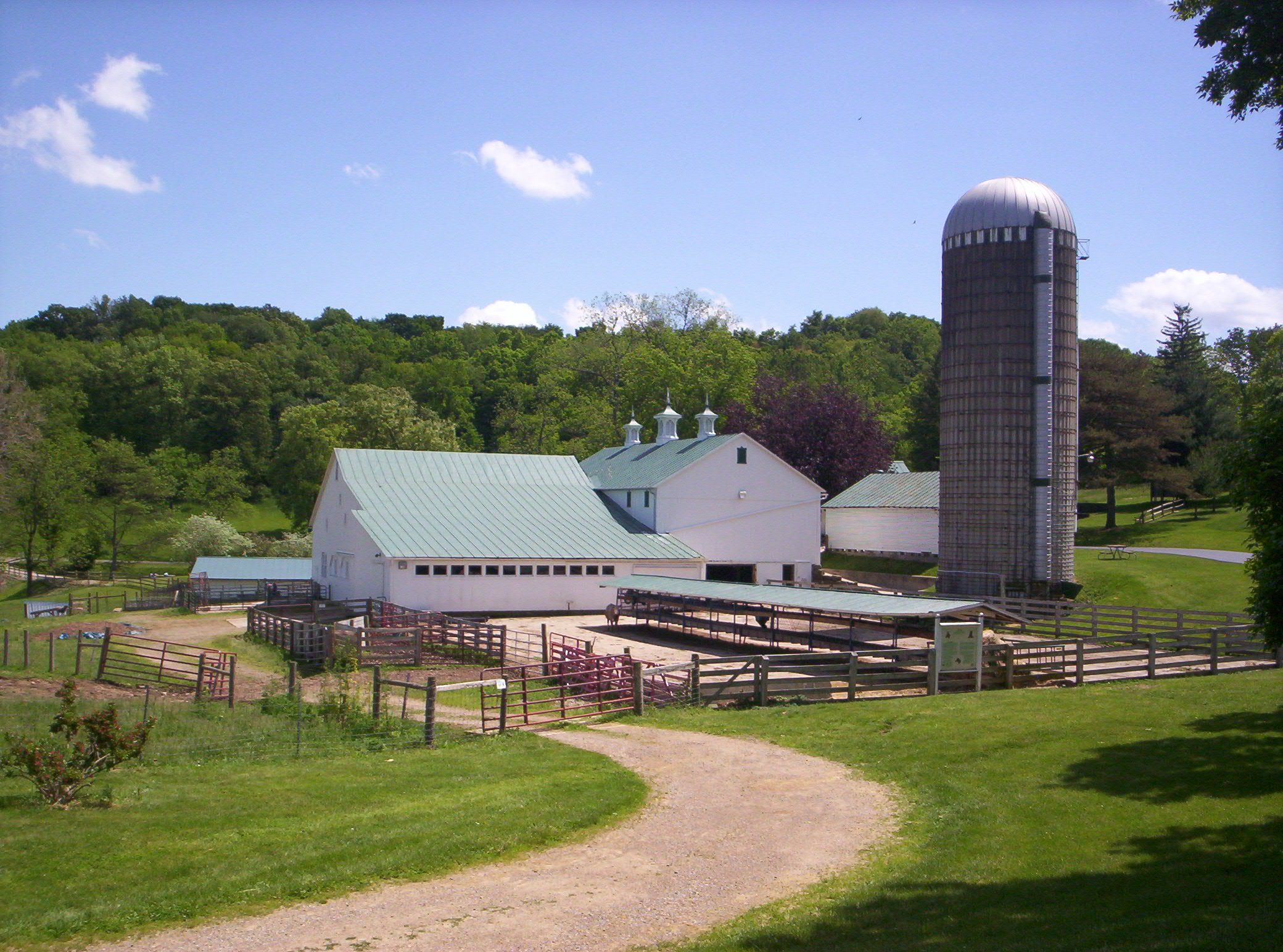
The Main Dairy Barn and Petting Farm.

Tours run seasonally.

=== Barn Dances ===
An evening Square Dance occurs monthly in the Big Barn with a live band during the warmer seasons. The traditional square dance style with informal attire welcomes all experience levels and ages. Wagon rides are usually offered during the dance near Halloween.

== See also ==
- Open-air museum
