= Timeline of the American Revolution =

Timeline of the American Revolution—timeline of the political upheaval culminating in the 18th century in which Thirteen Colonies in North America joined for independence from the British Empire, and after victory in the Revolutionary War combined to form the United States of America. The American Revolution includes political, social, and military aspects.

The revolutionary era is generally considered to have begun in the wake of the French and Indian War (1754-1763), as the British government abandoned its longstanding practice of salutary neglect of the colonies, now seeking greater control over them. Ten thousand regular British army troops were left stationed in North America after the war ended. Parliament passed measures to increase revenues from the colonies. The Stamp Act in 1765 and ended with the ratification of the United States Bill of Rights in 1791.

The military phase of the revolution, the American Revolutionary War, lasted from 1775 to 1783, but the land war effectively ended with the British surrender at Yorktown, Virginia October 19, 1781. Britain continued the international conflict after Yorktown, fighting naval engagements with France and Spain until the signing of the Peace Treaty of Paris in 1783. Historical background to the break between the Thirteen Colonies and Britain includes a chronology of the dynasties of Britain, ideas of kingship, its relation to Parliament; establishment of colonies with assemblies ruling local affairs, including taxation. British American colonists had the historical example a century before, 1649-1660, Commonwealth of England, the Interregnum. Charles I had ruled as an autocrat, without Parliament, and abused power. Wars ensued, which the king lost. Parliament put him on trial and executed him, establishing a republic with a written constitution. American colonists in the 18th century saw the erosion of their rights as freeborn English subjects, which were enshrined in English law, particularly the Magna Carta (1215), Habeas corpus, and the English Bill of Rights (1689).

- Gathering Storm, 1762-1774
- American Revolution, 1775-1800
- List of military leaders in the American Revolutionary War
- List of American Revolutionary War battles in chronological order, with location, outcome

== Origins of English rights ==
=== 1215 ===
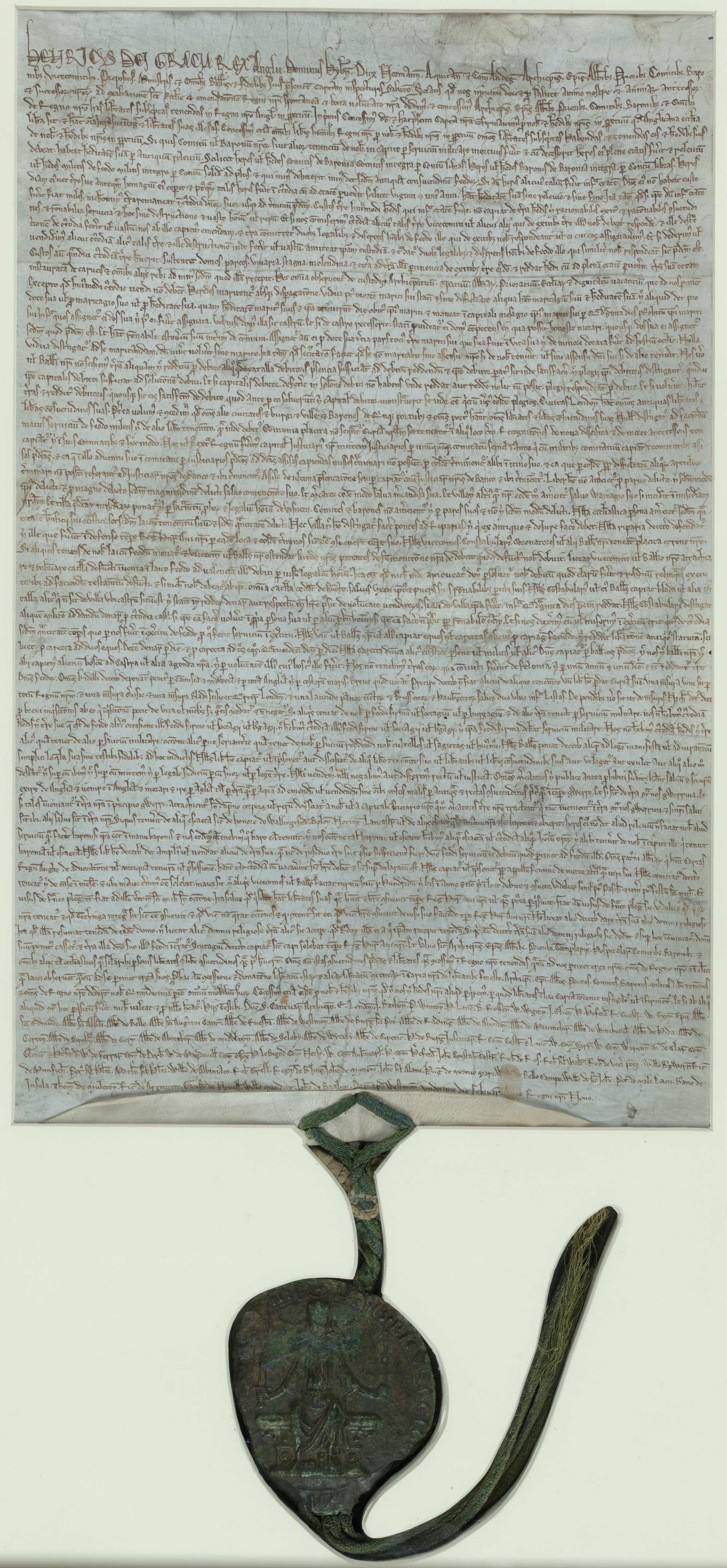
Magna Carta, the foundation of English common law

- Magna Carta ("Great Charter"). Rebellious barons forced John I of England to sign the charter which defined and limited the power of monarch and established that the monarch was not above the law. It mandated the prompt administration of justice, forbade the sale of justice, and established the principle of due process. Power was to be exercised with consent. It forbade the king from introducing new forms of taxation without consent. Although King John almost immediately repudiated it, saying he had signed it under duress, but he died shortly thereafter. His son Henry III affirmed Magna Carta in 1225 with some changed language, explicitly of his volition. It was reissued at intervals over the years, as a fundamental document protecting English rights. Starting with Elizabeth I's 1578 grant to Sir Humphrey Gilbert, charters contained key provisions: English colonists retained their rights as Englishmen under common law, of which Magna Carta was the first statute; colonial charters made explicit the right to an elective legislature. When American colonists fought against Britain, they were fighting not so much for new freedoms, but to preserve liberties and rights that they believed to be enshrined in Magna Carta.

=== 1236 ===
- Establishment of the English Parliament

== Tudor dynasty (1485–1603) ==
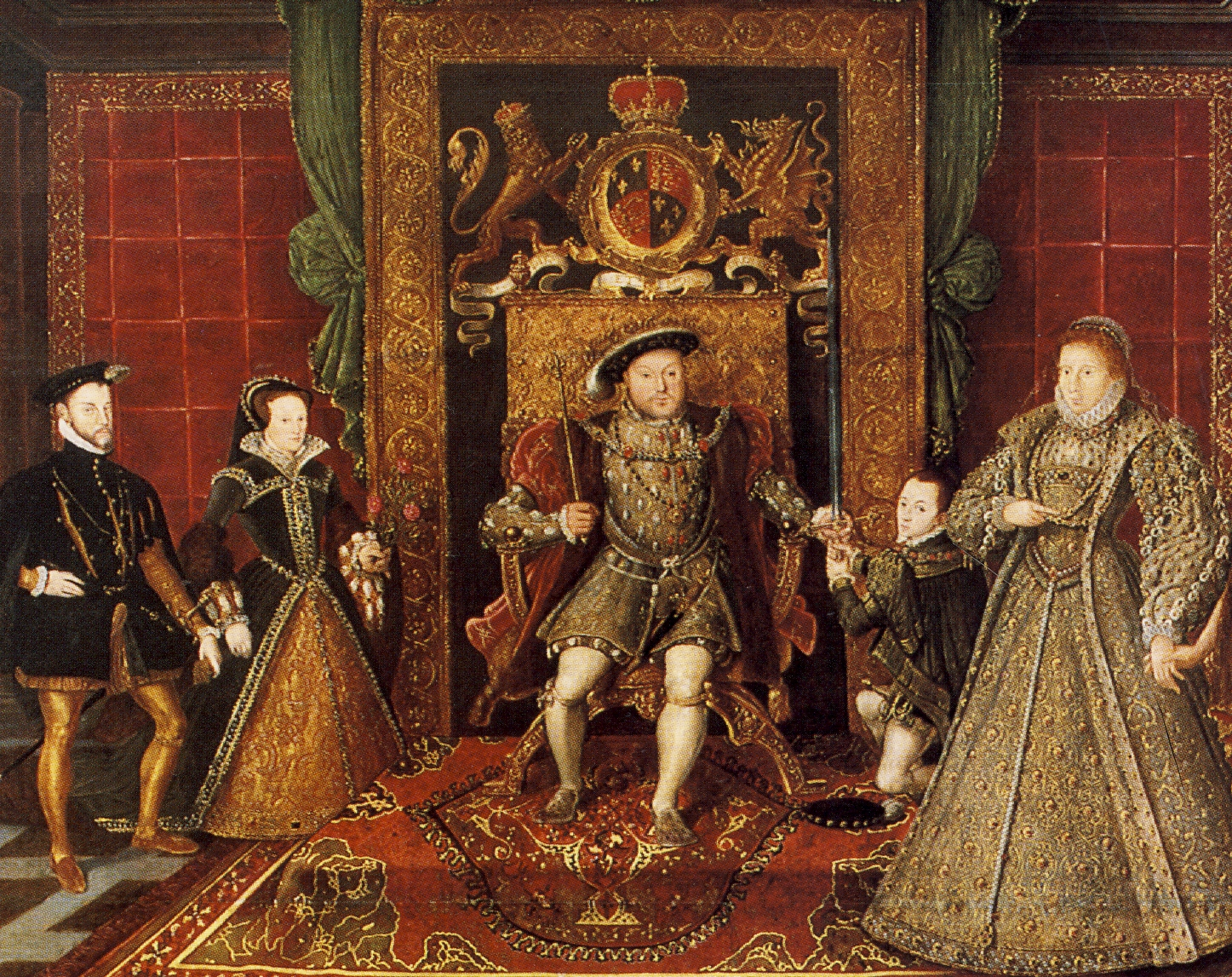
Allegorical painting of the House of Tudor monarchs

House of Tudor rules England from 1485 victory of Henry Tudor's victory in a dynastic war, making him Henry VII.

=== 1485-1509, Henry VII ===
First voyages of exploration by Portugal and Spain; voyage of Christopher Columbus, claiming sovereignty for Spain in the Western Hemisphere; division of the world between Portugal and Spain with the Treaty of Tordesillas(1494); first English voyages of exploration

=== 1497-1498 ===
- John Cabot voyages of exploration to the Western Hemisphere.

=== 1509-1547, Henry VIII ===
Henry VIII

=== 1516 ===
- Sir Thomas More publishes Utopia, full title The Best State of a Commonwealth and the New Island of Utopia

=== 1529-1536 ===
- English Reformation Parliament begins meeting 3 November 1529, lasting until 14 April 1536; established the legal basis for the English Reformation, passing major pieces of legislation, such as the Act of Supremacy making the monarch not the pope head of the church. The Reformation Parliament was the first in English history to deal with major religious legislation, transferring many aspects of English life away from the control of the Catholic Church to control under the Crown, and setting a precedent for future monarchs to utilize parliamentary statutes affecting the Church of England. It strengthened the role of the English Parliament and resulted in a massive transfer of wealth from the Catholic Church to the English Crown.

=== 1536-1541 ===
- Dissolution of the monasteries was the set of sweeping administrative and legal processes by which Henry VIII exercised unprecedented monarchical power over the Catholic Church, gutting all monasteries, priories, convents, and friaries in England, Wales, and Ireland; seized their wealth; disposed of their assets; destroyed buildings and relics; dispersed or destroyed libraries; and provided for a few of their former personnel and functions.

=== 1534-1541 ===
- Jacques Cartier explores North America for France, sailing up the St Lawrence River, claiming territory for Francis I of France.

=== 1536-1603 ===
- Tudor conquest of Ireland - Henry VIII (and his successors) become rulers of Ireland by the Crown of Ireland Act 1542. The conquest involved assimilating the Gaelic nobility by way of "surrender and regrant"; the confiscation and colonization ('plantation') of lands with settlers from Britain; imposing English law and language; banning Catholicism, dissolving the monasteries, and making Anglican Protestantism the state religion.

=== 1547-1553, Edward VI ===
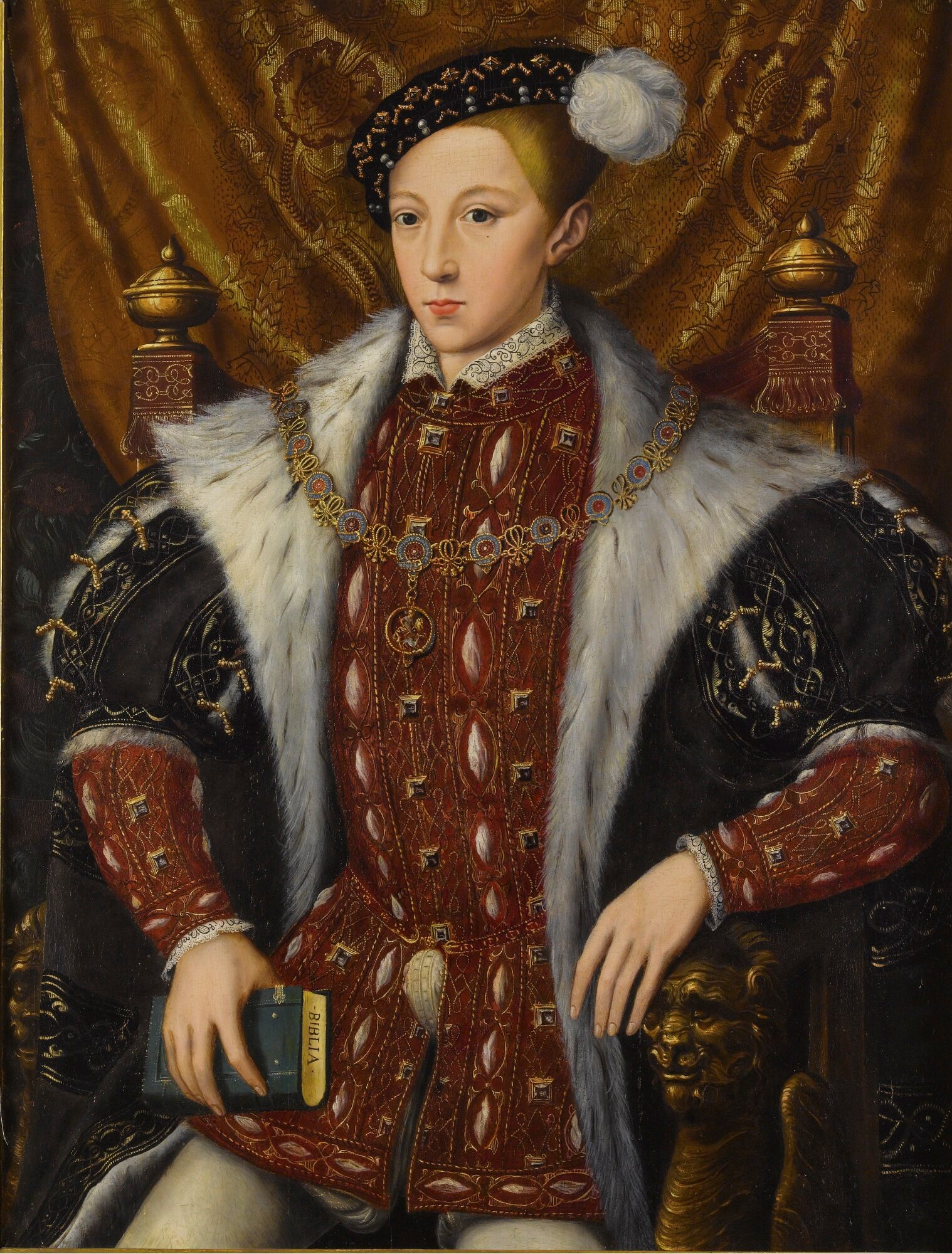
Edward VI

- Henry VIII dies, succeeded by his Protestant young son Edward VI by Jane Seymour, who dies before he reaches his majority and rule in his own right.
- The transformation of the Church of England into a recognizably Protestant body occurs under Edward, who even as a youth took great interest in religious matters. Although Henry VIII had severed the link between the English Church and Rome it continued to uphold most Catholic doctrine and ceremony. Under Edward, Protestantism was established for the first time in England, with reforms that included the abolition of clerical celibacy and the Mass and the imposition of compulsory English rather than Latin in church services.
- Edward VI dies, age 15. Succession is complicated because his older half-sister Mary is Catholic.

=== 1553-1558, Mary I ===
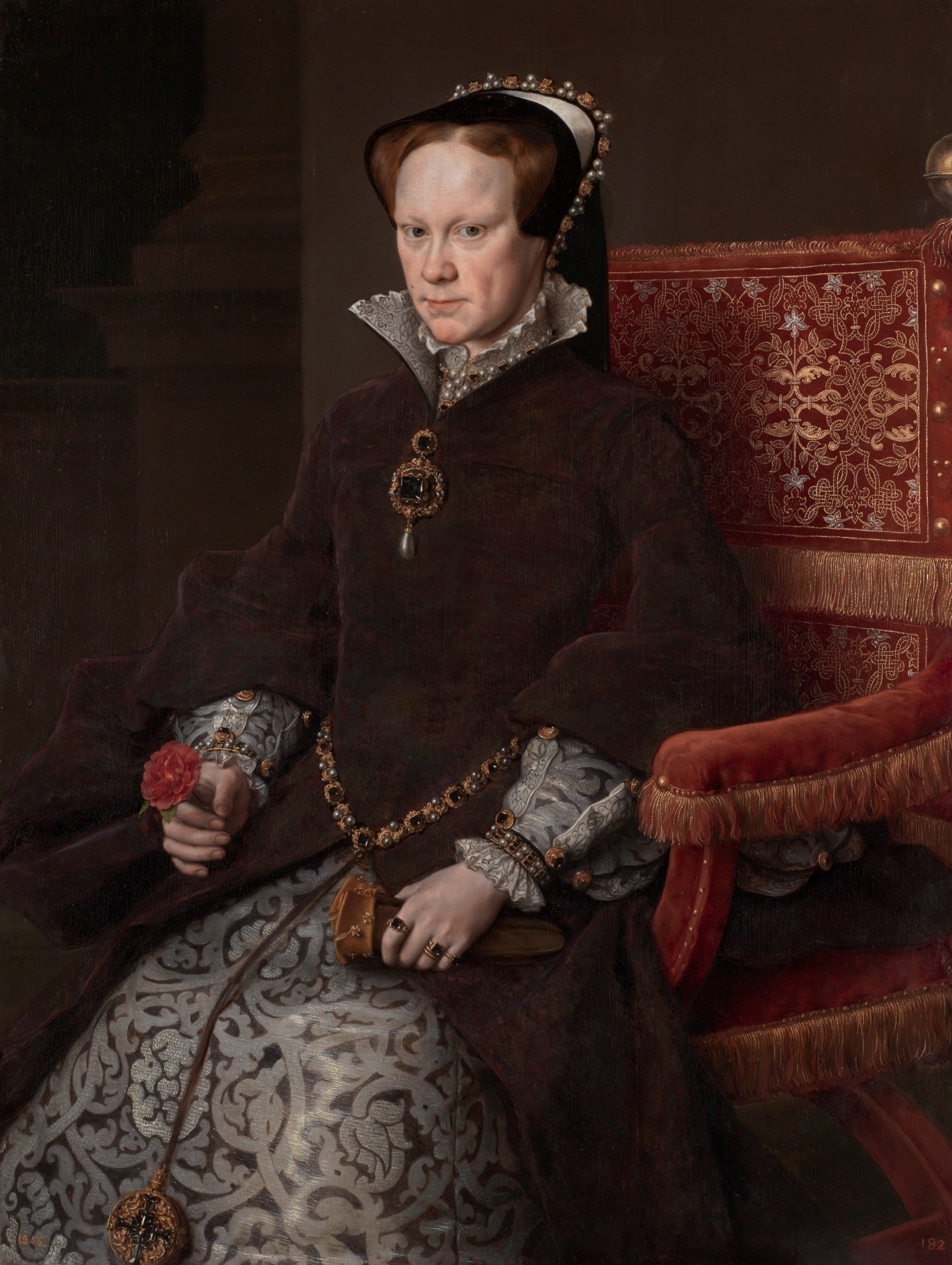
Mary I of England

- Mary I of England, oldest child of Henry VIII, daughter of Catherine of Aragon, succeeds to the throne. She is the first ruling queen in English history. She attempts to return England to Catholicism and restore church properties that her father Henry VIII had confiscated.
- Mary I weds Philip II of Spain; the marriage is childless. Her death in 1558 ends the attempt to restore Catholicism in England.

=== 1558-1603, Elizabeth I ===
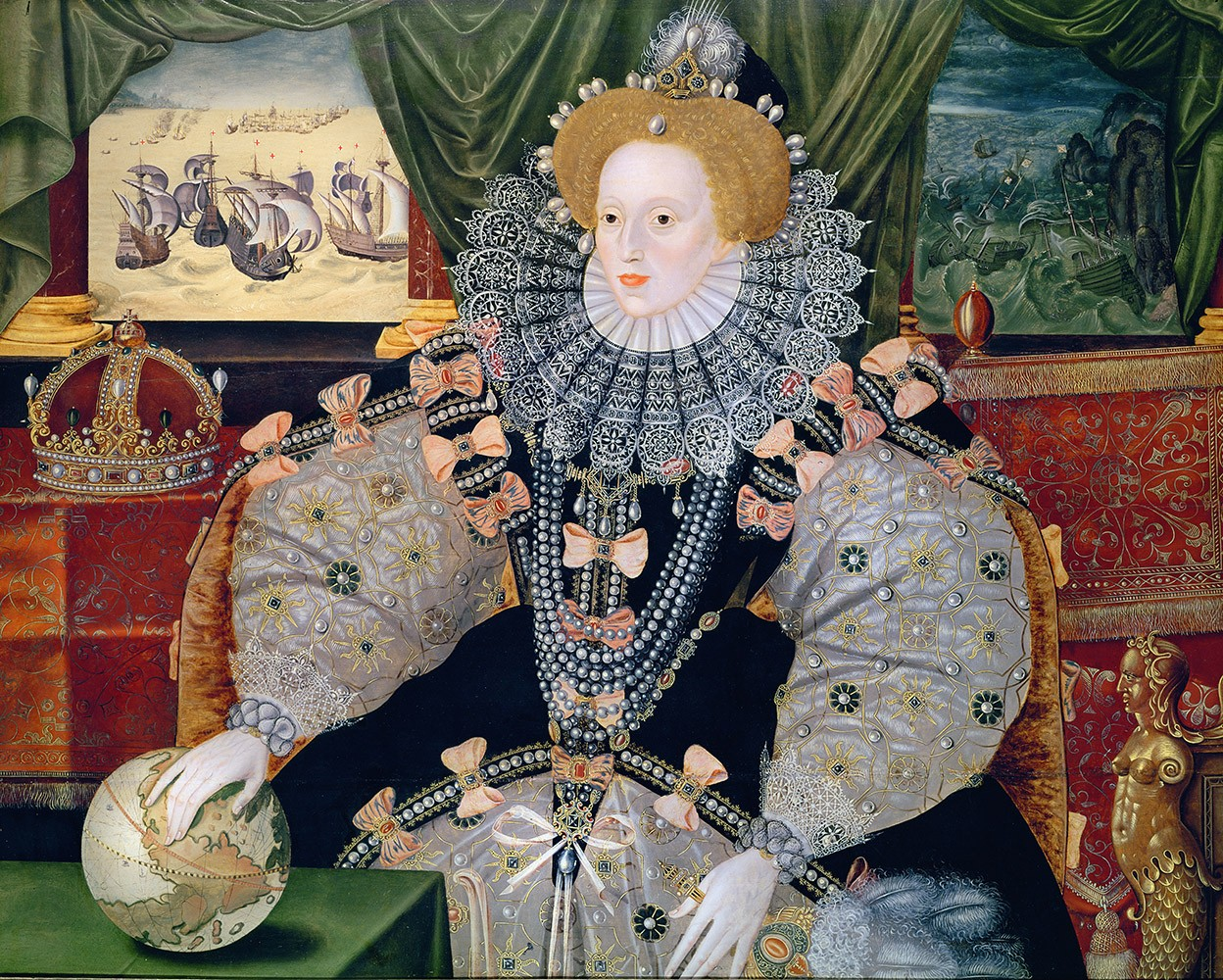
Elizabeth I, with an inset of the Spanish Armada

- Elizabeth I, Protestant, daughter of Anne Boleyn succeeds to the throne as a ruling queen, reigning 44 years. She never marries, leaving succession in doubt. England begins explorations in North America, aiming at planting colonies on the fringes of Spain's New World Empire.

=== 1558 ===
- Act of Supremacy, the act of Parliament restoring the English monarch and successors as head of the Church, reversing the policy of Mary I, and restoring Protestantism.

=== 1560s ===
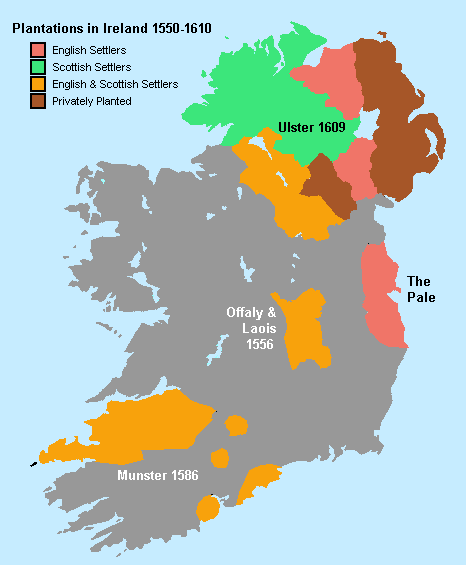
Protestant Plantations of settlers in Ireland, 1550-1610

- Expansion of the Tudor conquest of Ireland, aimed at subjugating the entire island and maintain it as a primitive economy with England supplying manufactured goods; beginning of plantation of Protestant English settlers. Ireland becomes a "laboratory of empire" for England. English come to have similar attitudes to the "wild Irish" and Native Americans during colonization of North America.

=== 1578 ===
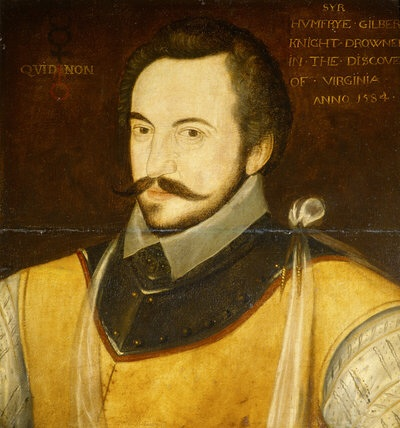
Sir Humphrey Gilbert

- Elizabeth I grants a charter to Sir Humphrey Gilbert, veteran colonizer of Protestants in Ireland, to explore and colonize territories "unclaimed by Christian kingdoms". The terms of the charter granted by the Queen had two key provisions, which all subsequent colonial charters contained: that English colonists brought with them the rights of Englishmen under common law colonial charters were to make explicit the implied right of an elected legislature. Gilbert understood it to give him rights to all territory in the New World north of Spanish Florida. Led by Gilbert, the English briefly claimed St. John's, Newfoundland, in 1583, as the first English territory in North America at the royal prerogative of Queen Elizabeth I, but Gilbert was lost at sea on his return journey to England.

=== 1584 ===
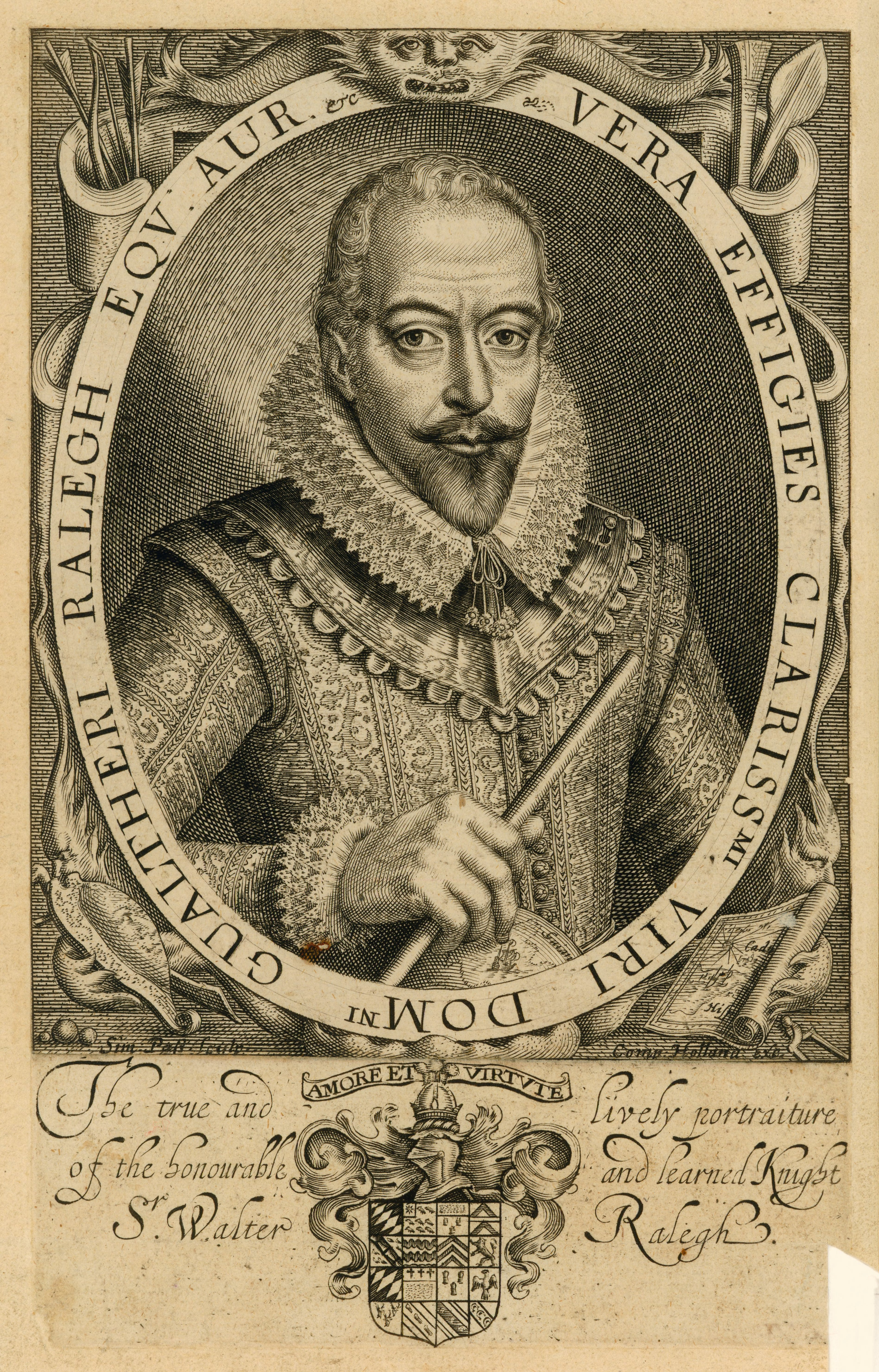
Sir Walter Raleigh

- Richard Hakluyt writes A Particuler Discourse Concerninge the Greate Necessitie and Manifolde Commodyties That Are Like to Growe to This Realme of Englande by the Westerne Discoueries Lately Attempted, Written in the Yere 1584, commissioned Sir Walter Raleigh and presented to the Queen. His objective was to recommend the enterprise of establishing English plantations in the region of North America not yet colonized by Europeans, and thus gain the Queen's support for Raleigh's expedition.
- Raleigh granted a a royal charter authorizing him to explore, colonize and rule any "remote, heathen and barbarous lands, countries and territories, not actually possessed of any Christian Prince or inhabited by Christian People", in return for one-fifth of all the gold and silver that might be mined there. (March)

=== 1585–1590 ===
- Roanoke Colony, two failed attempts by Sir Walter Raleigh to found the first permanent English settlement in North America. The first colony was established at Roanoke Island in 1585 as a military outpost, and was evacuated in 1586. The more famous second colony, known as the Lost Colony, began when a new group of settlers under John White arrived on the island in 1587; a relief ship in 1590 found the colony mysteriously abandoned. The fate of the 112 to 121 colonists remains unknown.

=== 1586 ===
- Welsh colonist Sir William Herbert plants a Protestant colony in Ireland; he had been granted lands confiscated from the Irish Catholic noble Gerald Fitzgerald, 15th Earl of Desmond. Herbert wrote a defense of colonization in Ireland, Croftus Sive de Hibernia Liber. He warned that colonists should not mix with the indigenous population, and urged the former to compel the latter to assimilate to the colonizers' culture.

=== 1588 ===
- Spanish Armada fails to conquer England.

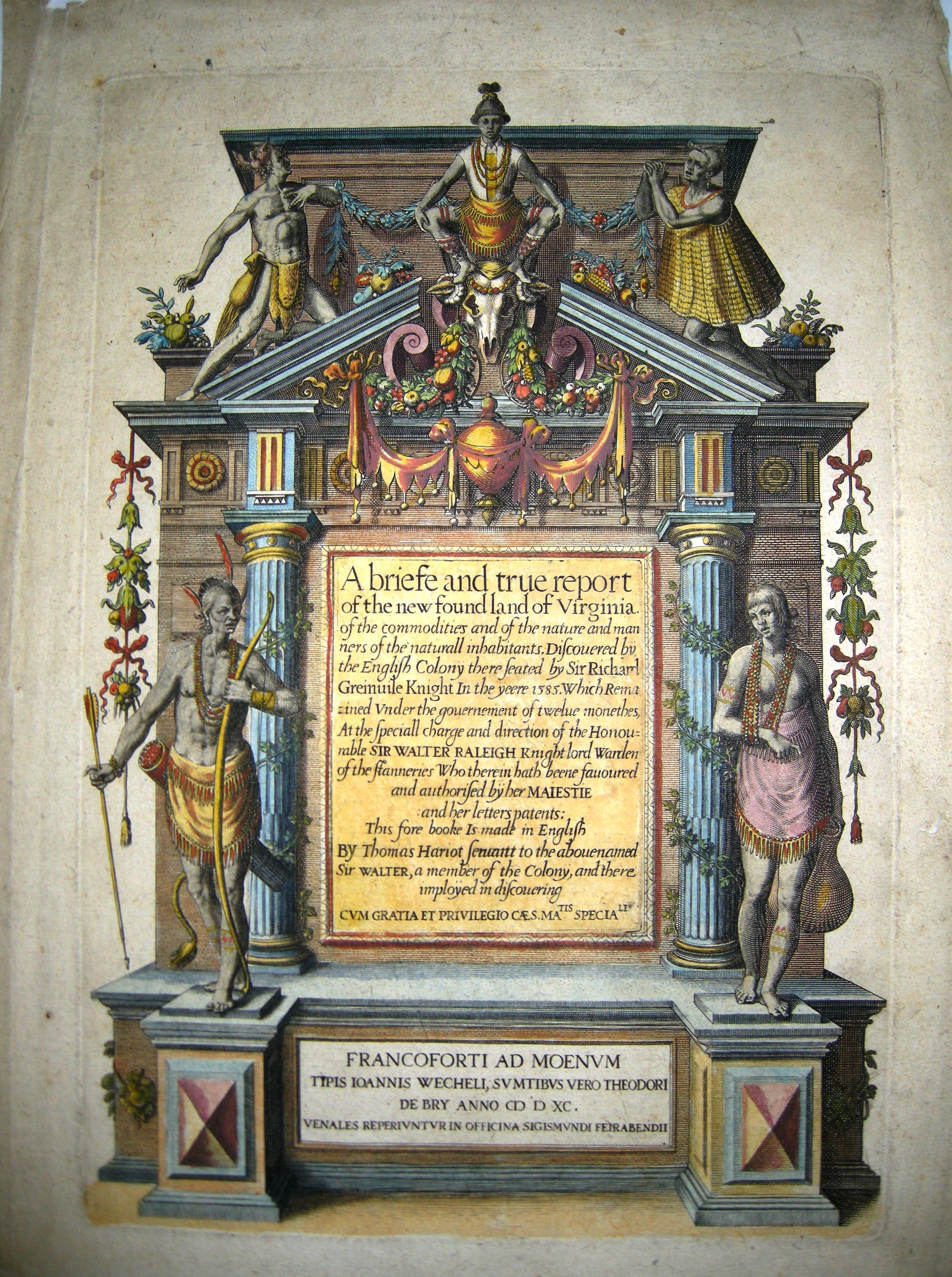
Title page of Thomas Harriot's True Report

- Thomas Harriot published A Briefe and True Report of the New Found Land of Virginia, an account of his voyage to Roanoke; contains an early account of the Native American population encountered by the expedition; it proved very influential upon later English explorers and colonists.

=== 1603 ===
- Elizabeth I, "the Virgin Queen", last Tudor monarch dies (March 24)

== 1603–1649, Stuart Dynasty ==
House of Stuart rules England, Scotland, and Ireland; seizing of islands in the Caribbean, previously monopolized by the Spanish; settlement of Protestants in majority Catholic Ireland, England's first colony; successful overseas English settlements established in North America and the Caribbean.

=== 1603-1625, James I of England ===
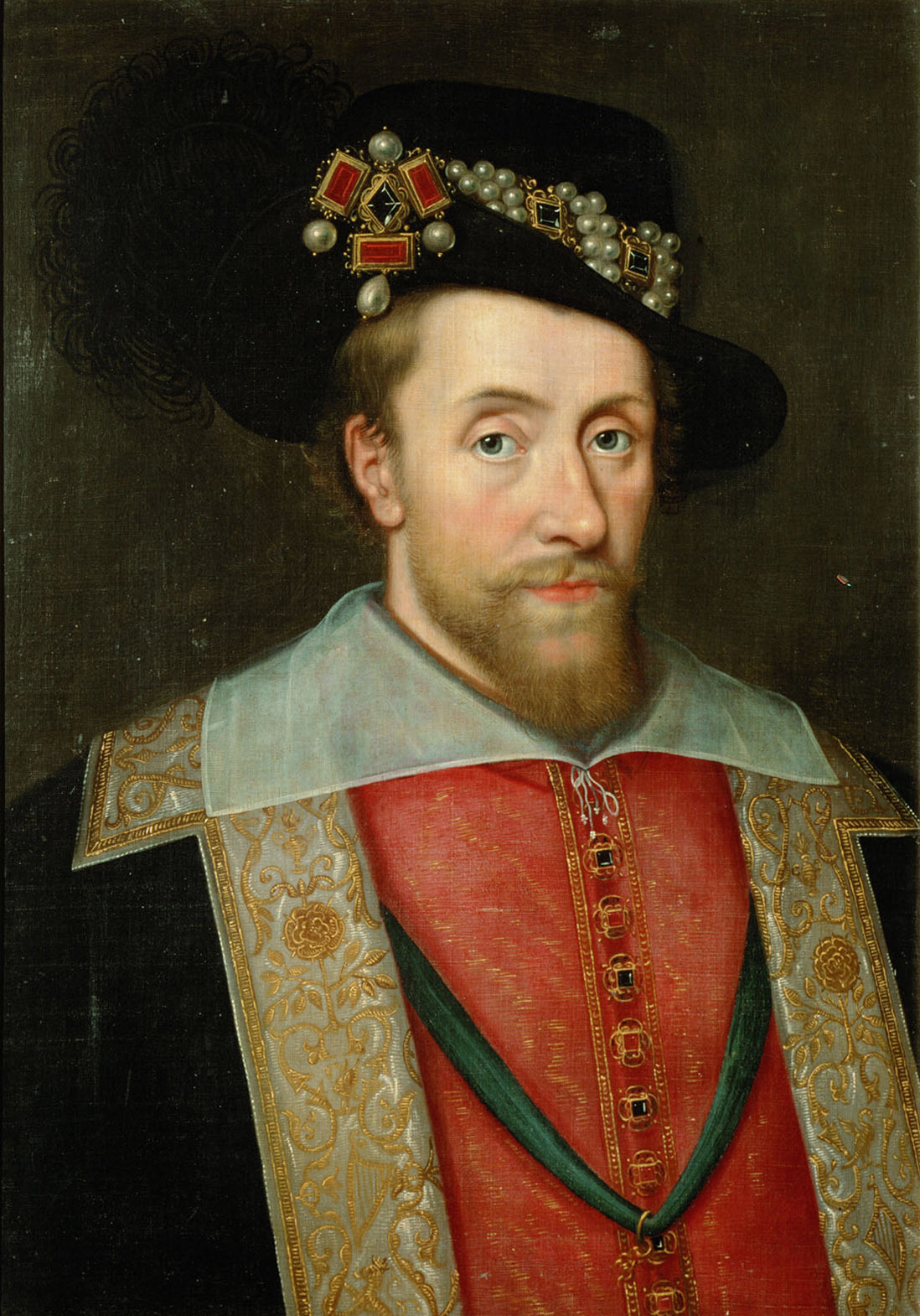
James VI of Scotland, I of England

- James VI of Scotland succeeds to the throne of England as James I, ruling each separately in a composite monarchy. James previously wrote The True Law of Free Monarchies, asserting the idea of absolutism and the divine right of kings. As a king of Scotland with separate laws, he had not had the limits of the English Magna Carta on his power as king. English overseas possessions remained in English hands and Scots subjects were barred from participating in settling in the colonies or profiting from trade with them.

=== 1605 ===
- Gunpowder Plot unsuccessful Catholic plot to kill James VI/I by blowing up the English House of Parliament (November 5)

=== 1606 ===
Coat of Arms of the Virginia Company

- Virginia Company established as a corporation to colonize the east coast of North America.

=== 1607 ===
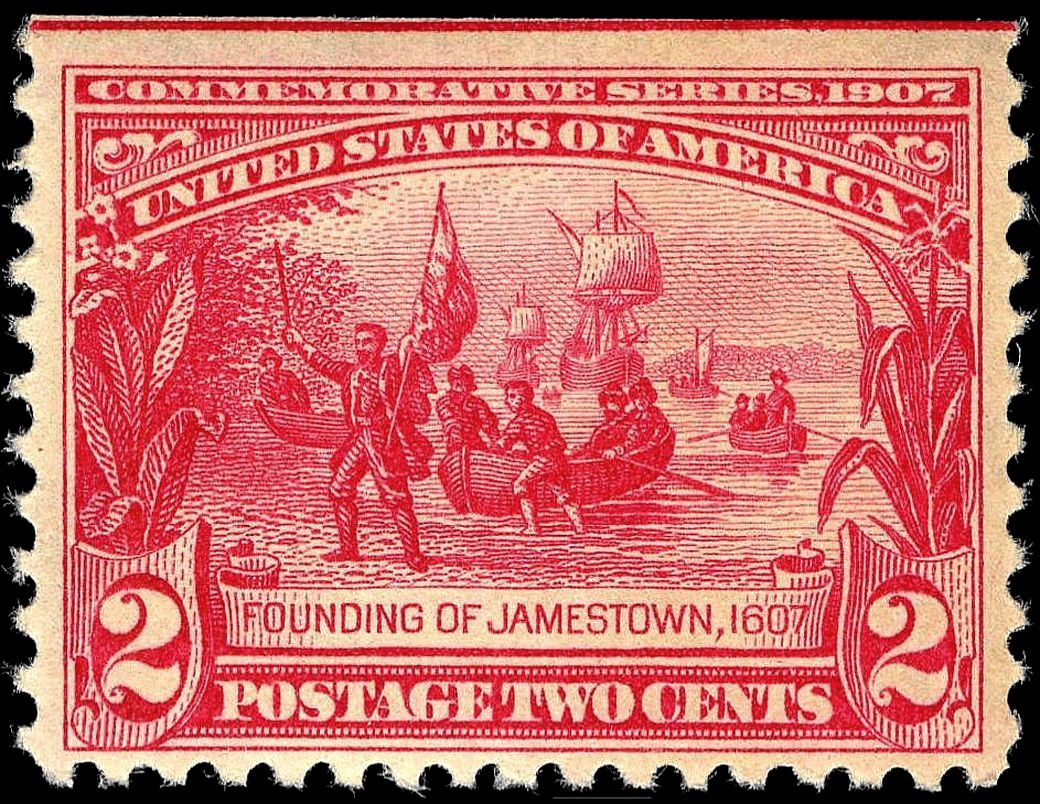
Jamestown's founding commemorated 1907

- Jamestown, founded May 14 by the Virginia Company as a charter company, named for James I; the first permanent English settlement in North America

=== 1607-1610 ===
- English voyages of exploration by Henry Hudson

=== 1608 ===
- Samuel Champlain founds Quebec on the St Lawrence River in New France

=== 1609 ===
- Bermuda settled by the English.

=== 1610 ===
- First printed version of the 1215 Magna Carta

=== 1612 ===
- Bermuda officially becomes part of Virginia.
- John Rolfe, Virginia settler who married Native American Pocahontas, successfully cultivates a strain of tobacco that appeals to English tastes; it became the cash crop central to the Virginia economy throughout the whole colonial era.

=== 1619 ===
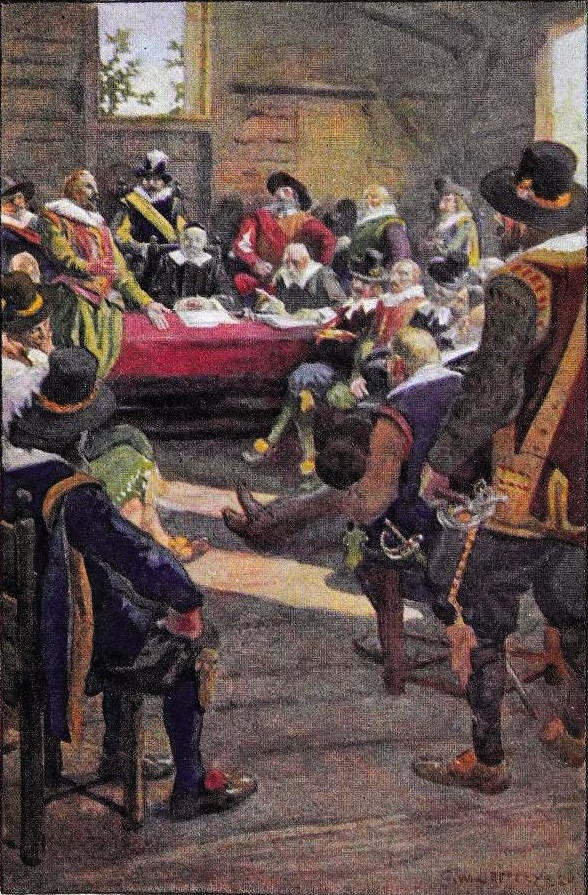
Depiction (1921) of the first meeting of the Virginia assembly

- House of Burgesses established, the first representative legislature in the Americas, meeting in Jamestown, Virginia, (July 19) The (Thirteen Colonies) were part of the emerging English empire and all had elected assemblies with a broad suffrage for free, white, male colonists.

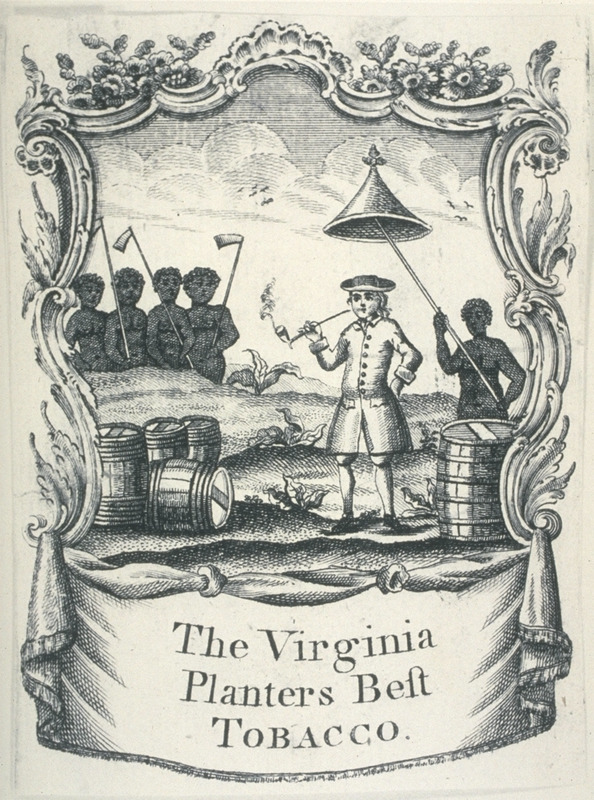
Tobacco, enslaved African workers, English colonist (ca. 1750)

- First enslaved Africans arrive in Virginia, August. Slavery came to exist in all Thirteen Colonies and continued after the establishment of the United States. In Virginia, tobacco as a cash crop and the use of enslaved Africans made the Virginia colony flourish economically.

=== 1620 ===
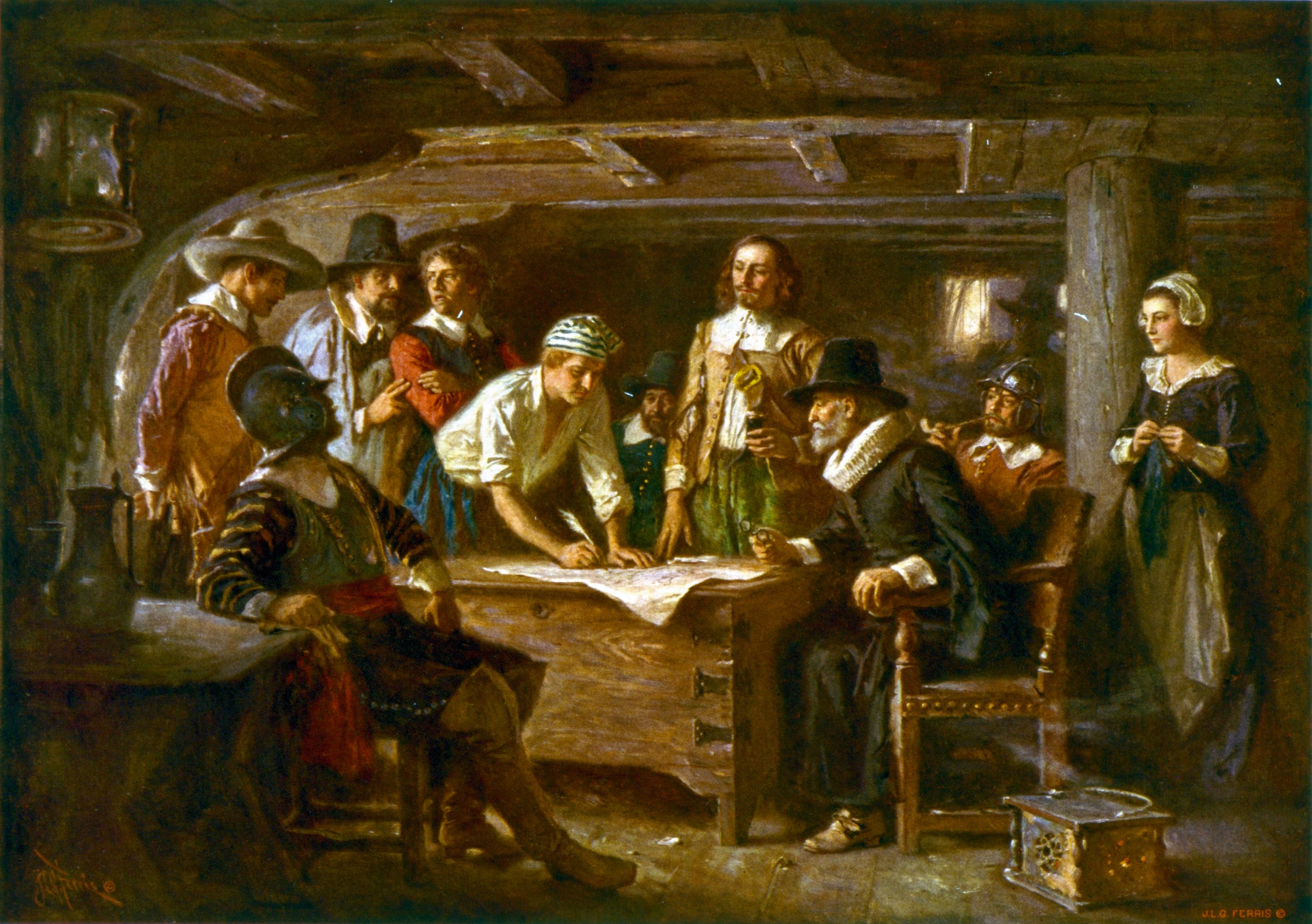
Signing The Mayflower Compact

- Mayflower Compact Nov. 21, 1620, founding document of the Plymouth Colony of Pilgrims, signed aboard the ship Mayflower
- Plymouth Colony established as a self-governing settlement of religious refugees; Pilgrims elect William Bradford governor
- James I asserts sovereignty over the Caribbean island of Nevis.

=== 1623 ===
- West Indies island of St. Kitts colonized by the English.

=== 1624 ===
- Virginia becomes a royal colony

=== 1625 ===
- Barbados claimed for James I of England.

=== Charles I, 1625-1649 ===
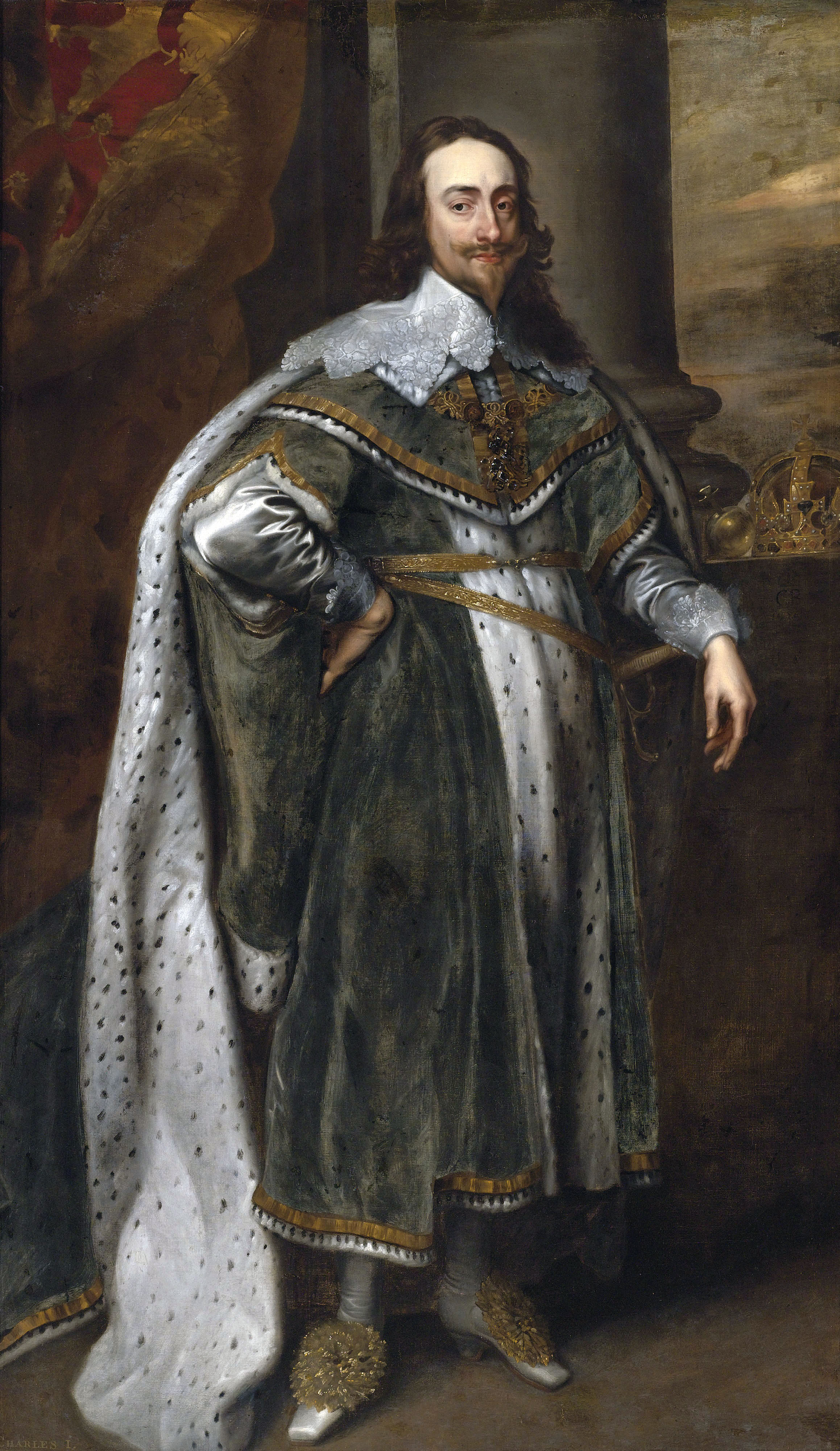
Charles I

Son of James VI/I, Charles I believes in the divine right of kings and increasingly rules as an autocrat, without Parliament. A series of wars break out, including the English Civil War between royalists and Parliamentarians. The king is captured, put on trial, and publicly executed in 1649.

=== 1627 ===
- Caribbean Island of Barbados seized from the Spanish.

=== 1628 ===
- Caribbean island of Nevis settled by the English.
- Petition of Right (7 June 1628), is an English constitutional document setting out specific individual protections against the state. It was part of a wider conflict between Parliament and the Charles I. The king had imposed "forced loans", and imprisoned those who refused to pay, without trial. He used of martial law to force private citizens to feed, clothe and accommodate soldiers and sailors, implying that the king could deprive any individual of property, or freedom, without justification. The House of Commons and the House of Lords unite to stop the king's abuse of power.

=== 1629 ===
- The Cambridge Agreement (August 26, 1629)

=== 1629-1640 ===
- Personal rule by Charles I, ruling without Parliament; also known as "The Eleven Years' Tyranny".

=== 1630 ===
- John Winthrop leads Puritan settlers to Massachusetts Bay. "Great Migration" of Puritans begins, with some 21,000 English men and women migrating by 1642. They come in family groups for religious reasons.

=== 1632 ===
Coat of Arms of Lord Baltimore

- Maryland founded as a proprietary colony with a charter from Charles I to Lord Baltimore as a refuge for English Catholics.
- Islands of Antigua and Montserrat settled by colonists from St. Kitts

=== 1634 ===
- St. Mary's City founded, serves as the capital of Maryland.

=== 1635 ===
- Roger Williams banished from Massachusetts, founds Rhode Island colony
- Hartford, Connecticut founded.

=== 1636 ===
- Harvard College, Cambridge, Massachusetts founded; oldest institution of higher education in America; its founding is important for the idea that the colonial settlement could create its own centers of learning, independent of Europe; Founding Fathers alumni John Adams (1755) and his older cousin Samuel Adams (1740) are most well-known; other alumni signers of the Declaration of Independence are John Hancock (1754), Elbridge Gerry (1765), Robert Treat Paine (1749), William Ellery (1747), William Williams (1751), William Hooper (1760)
- Providence, Rhode Island founded, named for "divine Providence."
- Thomas Hooker departs Massachusetts and helps found the Connecticut colony

=== 1639-1653 ===
- Wars of the Three Kingdoms were a series of conflicts fought between 1639 and 1653 in the kingdoms of England, Scotland and Ireland, then separate entities in a personal union under Charles I. They include the 1639 to 1640 Bishops' Wars, the First and Second English Civil Wars, the Irish Confederate Wars, the Cromwellian conquest of Ireland and the Anglo-Scottish War of 1650–1652. They resulted in the execution of Charles I, the abolition of monarchy, and founding of the Commonwealth of England, a unitary state which controlled the British Isles until the Stuart Restoration in 1660.

=== 1641 ===
- Grand Remonstrance, list of grievances presented to King Charles I of England by the English Long Parliament on 1 December 1641, a key event, precipitating the English Civil War 1642–49.

=== 1642-1651 ===
- English Civil War breaks out, bloody conflict between Royalists supporting Charles I of England and Roundheads supporting Parliament. Establishment in 1645 by Parliament of the New Model Army, a standing army whose recruits were liable for military service anywhere they are ordered rather than just locally.
  - Putney Debates, discussion by senior officers of the New Model Army over the political settlement to follow Parliament's victory over Charles I in the First English Civil War. Most, including Oliver Cromwell favored retaining Charles within the framework of a constitutional monarchy, and radicals such as the Levellers who sought more sweeping changes, including one man, one vote and freedom of conscience, particularly in religion. (28 Oct-8 Nov)

=== 1643 ===
- New England Confederation of colonies established during the English Civil War; primary purpose was to unite the Puritan colonies in support of the Congregational church, and for mutual defense against the Native Americans and the Dutch colony of New Netherland; first cooperative effort of English colonies.

== 1649–1660, Commonwealth of England, the "Interregnum" ==
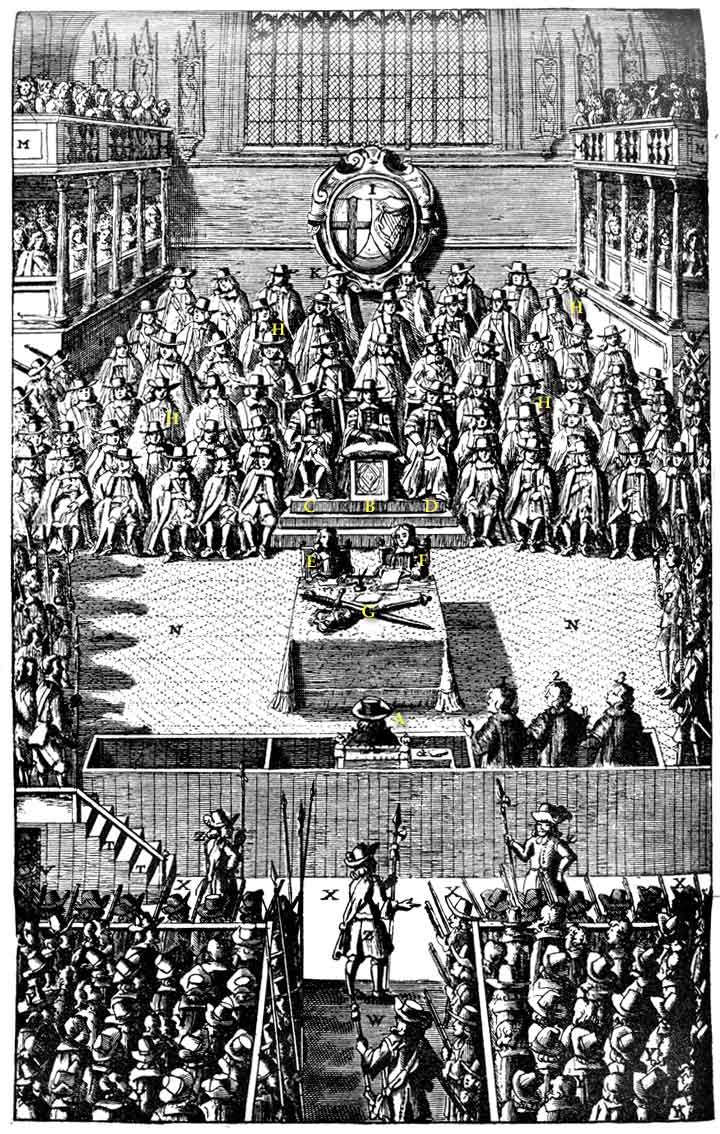
Trial of Charles I

Flag of the Commonwealth

Oliver Cromwell, Lord Protector, 1653–1658

Coat of Arms of the Protectorate, 1653–1659

- Trial of Charles I for treason by an ad hoc High Court, found guilty, and publicly executed by beheading. Oliver Cromwell is among those signing the death warrant. 30 January. Charles claimed the court had no jurisdiction to try him, asserting he ruled by divine right. The trial and execution of Charles I remain pivotal events that challenged the traditional ideas of monarchy. Patrick Henry references Charles I's fate in his "Give me liberty or give me death" speech.
- Commonwealth of England, Scotland, and Ireland, republic established 19 May 1649 by Parliament, lasting until 1660, when the monarchy is restored. It was England's first and only republic.
- Maryland Toleration Act 1649, established religious toleration for all Christians, including Catholics. The colony was founded as a refuge for Catholics and protections continued during the Commonwealth.
- Board of Trade established 1650
- Act prohibiting trade with Barbados, Virginia, Bermuda, and Antigua for recognizing Charles II as ruler rather than Parliament. (October 30)
- Navigation Act of 1651, 1652
- Cromwell reforms the navy, increasing the number of ships, promoting officers on merit rather than family connections, and cracking down on embezzlement by suppliers and dockyard staff, thereby positioning England to mount a global challenge to Dutch mercantile dominance.
- First Anglo-Dutch War 1652–53. The Commonwealth challenges the Dutch Republic, seeking to weaken it as a commercial power and carrier of goods.
- Instrument of Government, first written constitution for England, Scotland, Ireland and overseas possessions adopted 15 December 1653. Power was formally split.
  - Executive power was held by the Lord Protector. The post was elective, not hereditary, but appointment was to be held for life.
  - Legislation was raised in Parliament. These had to be called triennially, with each sitting for at least five months.
  - Provision for a standing army was made "of 10,000 horse and dragoons, and 20,000 foot, in England, Scotland and Ireland, for the defense and security thereof" and "a convenient number of ships for guarding of the seas" (XXVII).
  - Permanent intolerance of Roman Catholicism.
- First Families of Virginia arrive 1647–1660. Major migration of royalists fleeing the Commonwealth of England. Virginia comes to be known as the "Old Dominion" for its loyalty to the crown.
- Battle of the Severn, Maryland, a Puritan force fighting under a Commonwealth flag defeated a Royalist force fighting for Lord Baltimore 25 March 1655
- Jews allowed to resettle in England 1655; banned since 1290.
- The Western Design was Cromwell's policy to seize Spanish possessions in the Caribbean and establish Protestant colonies, sending a major fleet of warships and significant manpower. Capture of Jamaica from Spain after England's failure to take Hispaniola. May 1655. Jamaica becomes Britain's richest possession, producing sugar with black slave labor.
- Jews allowed to settle in Newport, Rhode Island, a major center of colonial trade. 1658.
- Death of Oliver Cromwell 1658, succession of his ill-prepared son Richard Cromwell as Lord Protector
- Resignation of Richard Cromwell 1659.

== 1660–1688, Stuart Dynasty Restoration ==
=== 1660 ===
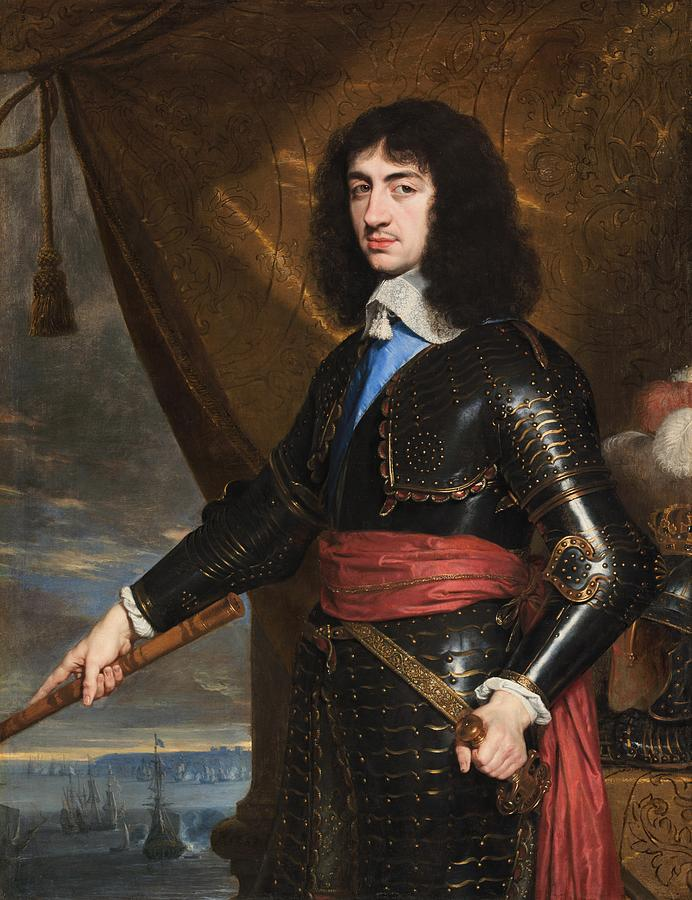
Charles II r. 1660–1685

- Restoration of the Stuart monarchy, Charles II returns from European exile
  - Declaration of Breda (4 April 1660) Charles promises a general pardon for crimes committed during the English Civil War and the Interregnum for all those who recognized Charles as the lawful king; religious toleration; and the payment of arrears to members of the army, and that the army would be recommissioned into service under the crown.
- Royal authority returns to the colonies
- Restoration government passes its version of the Navigation Acts.

=== 1662 ===
- Act of Uniformity 1662 passes and leads to the Great Ejection. As a consequence, New England Puritanism officially separated from the Church of England.

=== 1663 ===
- Carolina proprietors receive a royal charter for Carolina colony

=== 1664 ===
- Charles II dispatches the Royal Commission of 1664 to evaluate the New England Colonies and attempt to strengthen royal rule.
- English seize Dutch colony of New Netherland, renaming it New York
- Charles II grants New York to his brother James, Duke of York as proprietor. He subdivides it and creates New Jersey.
- Delaware Colony founded.

=== 1670 ===
- Charles Town, South Carolina founded

=== 1675-1678 ===
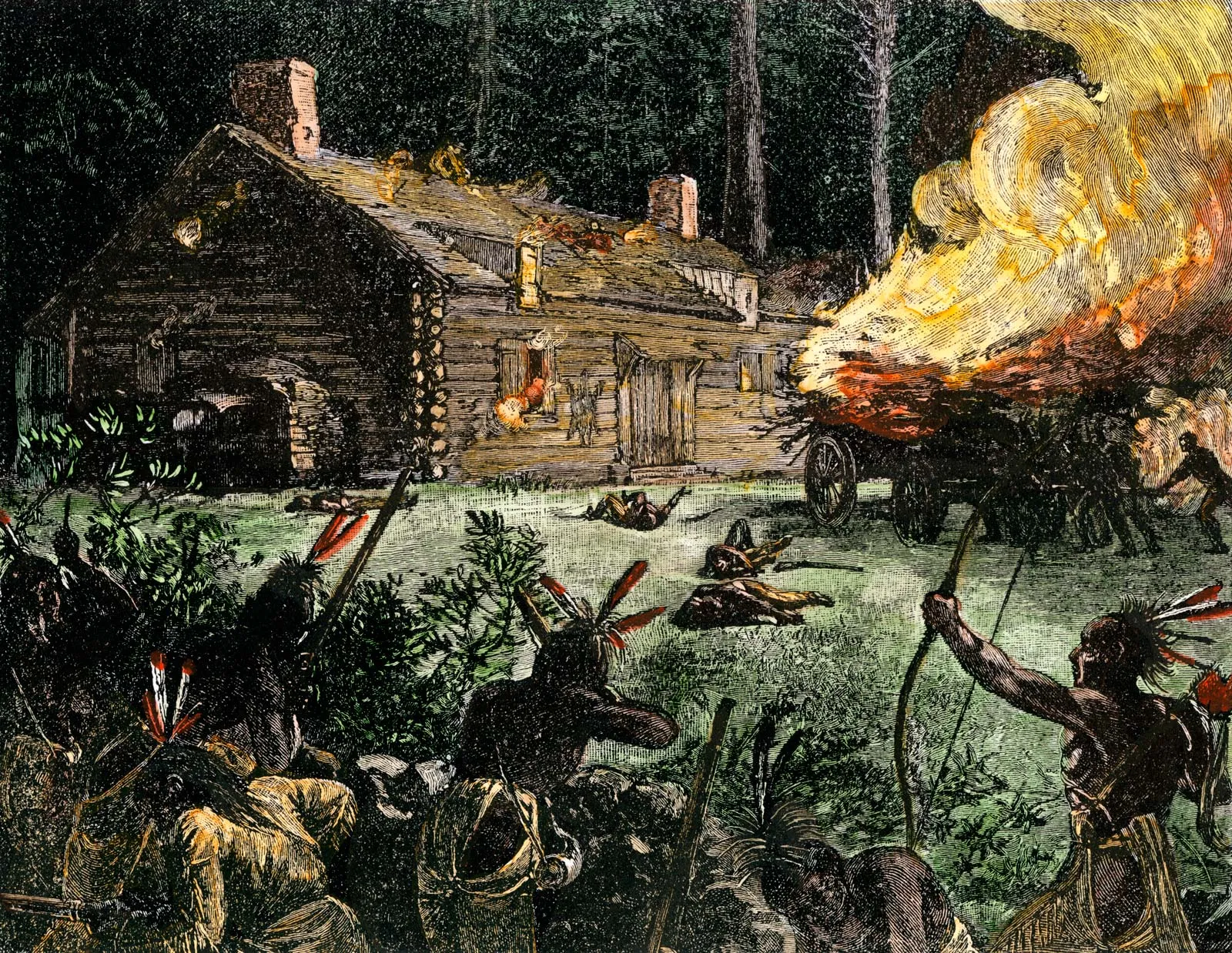
King Philip's War attack

- King Philip's War was an armed conflict in 1675–1678 in New England between a group of indigenous peoples of the Northeastern Woodlands against the English New England Colonies and their indigenous allies. The colonies assembled the largest army that New England had yet mustered, consisting of 1,000 militia and 150 Native allies. The war caused enormous loss of life and tremendous damage economically. The war was the last-ditch effort by Native tribes to expel the colonists from New England, which instead helped create an independent American identity. The New England colonists fought the war themselves without support from any European government or military, giving them a group identity separate and distinct from England.

=== 1676–77 ===
- Bacon's Rebellion, an armed rebellion by Virginia settlers against Governor William Berkeley for his failure to drive Native Americans from the colony's frontiers; rebels torch the capital of Jamestown.

=== 1679 ===
- Habeas Corpus Act 1679 was passed by Parliament to define and strengthen the ancient prerogative writ of habeas corpus, which required a court to examine the lawfulness of a prisoner's detention and thus prevent unlawful or arbitrary imprisonment.
- The Province of New Hampshire is carved out of Norfolk County, Massachusetts Colony based on the petitions of Robert Tufton Mason to the king.

=== 1679-1681 ===
- Exclusion Crisis during the reign of King Charles II of England bills in Parliament sought to exclude the King's brother and heir presumptive, James, Duke of York, from succession to the throne because he was a Roman Catholic. Although none of the bills became law, two new parties formed. The Tories were opposed to this exclusion, were generally conservative. The other party, while the Whigs, supported it. Whigs later became important supporters of the American colonists' position in opposition to actions of the monarch.

=== 1682 ===
- Philadelphia founded by Quaker William Penn, proprietor of the Pennsylvania colony.
- Edward Cranfield sent to New Hampshire as governor. He is the first unelected, royally commissioned governor in New England.

=== 1683 ===
- The Lords of Trade issue quo warranto writs for the charters of several North American colonies, including Massachusetts (June 3)
- Short-lived Gove's Rebellion occurs in New Hampshire in opposition to direct royal rule.

=== 1684 ===
- Revocation of the Massachusetts Charter by Charles II (June 18)

=== 1685 ===
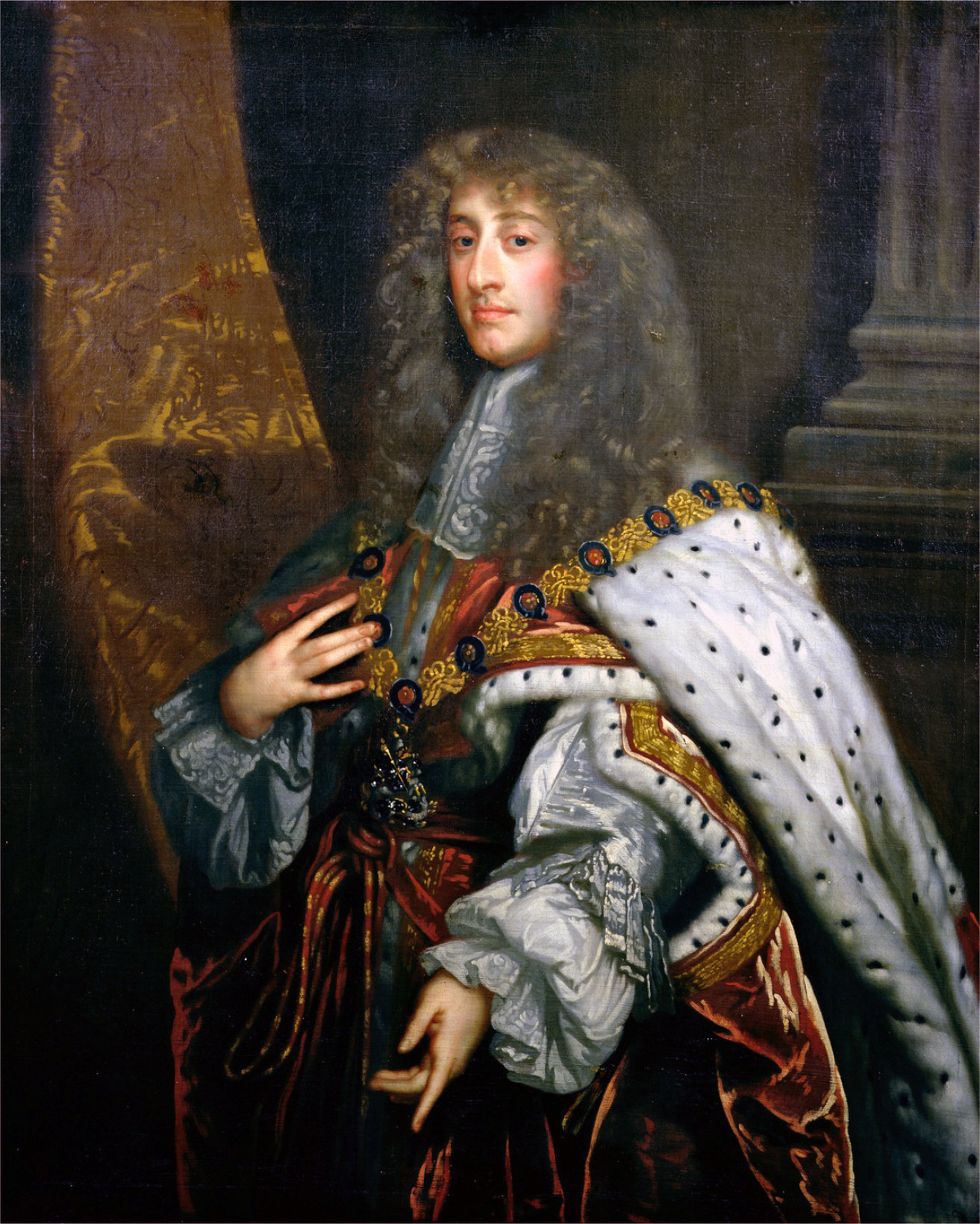
James II, r. 1685–88

- Charles II dies with no legitimate offspring; succeeded by his younger brother, James II.

=== 1686 ===
- Disestablishment of the New England Confederation
- Royal Charter arrives in Boston establishing the Dominion of New England in America (May 14), centralizing the administration of formerly separate crown colonies in New England and the Middle colonies during the reign of James II of England

== 1688–1700 ==
=== 1688 ===
Expeditionary banner of William III Dutch stadholder during his successful invasion

- Glorious Revolution or the Revolution of 1688, the ouster of Catholic James II of England as monarch by Protestant royals William III, James II's nephew, and Mary II, James II's daughter, becoming joint monarchs, but with power held by Parliament.

=== 1689 ===
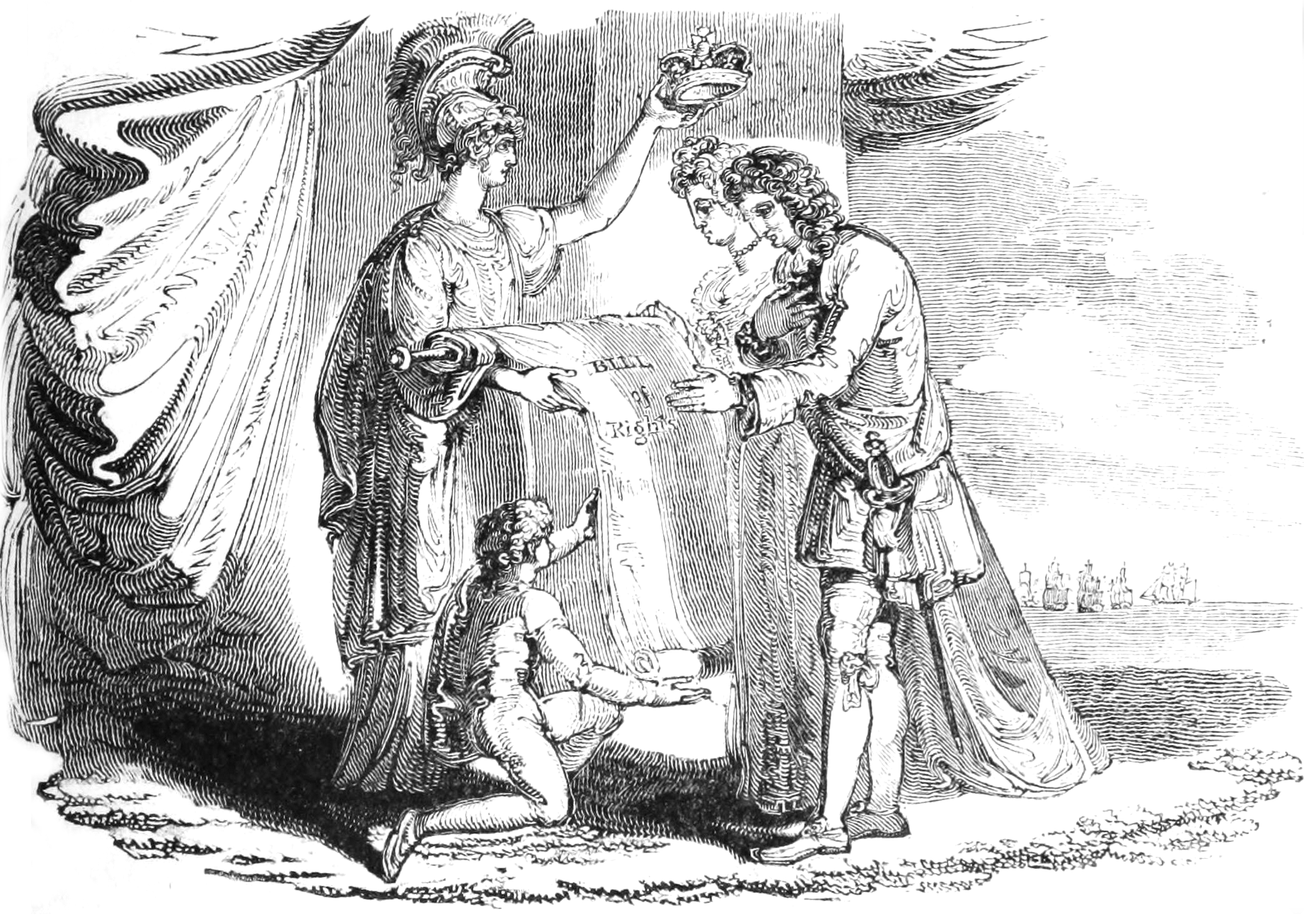
Allegory of the English Bill of Rights, with Wm. III and Mary II signing the document

- English Bill of Rights, the Act of Parliament, enumerating basic civil rights and changed the succession to the English Crown, requiring Protestant succession. It remains a crucial statute in English constitutional law. It sets out a constitutional requirement for the Crown to seek the consent of the people as represented in Parliament; sets limits on the powers of the monarch; it established the supremacy of Parliament, including regular parliaments, free elections, and parliamentary privilege. It also listed individual rights, including the prohibition of cruel and unusual punishment and the right not to pay taxes levied without the approval of Parliament. The Bill of Rights received royal assent on 16 December 1689.
- 1689 Boston revolt, Leaders of the former Massachusetts Bay Colony reclaim control of the government. In other colonies, members of governments displaced return to power (April 18)
- Leisler's Rebellion in New York, breaking territory away from the Dominion of New England, ending in 1691.
- Protestant Revolution (Maryland), also known as Coode's rebellion, overthrew the Catholic proprietary government.

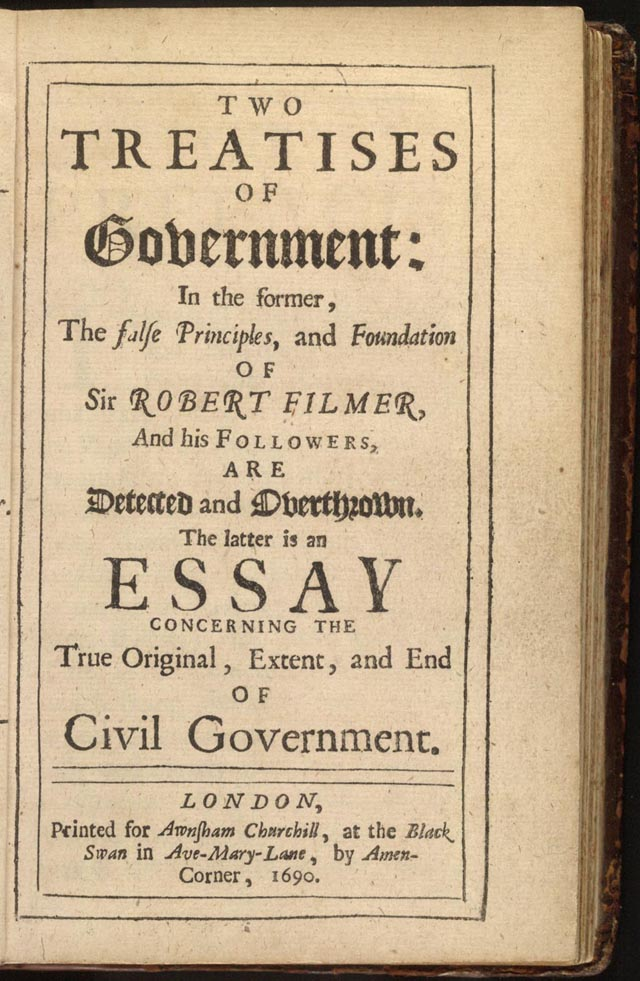
Locke's Two Treatises

- John Locke anonymously publishes Two Treatises of Government. The Second Treatise outlines Locke's ideas for a more civilized society based on natural rights and contract theory. The book is a key foundational and influential text in the theory of liberalism.

=== 1690 ===
- Massachusetts Bay Colony the first to issue paper money, with other colonies following.

=== 1691 ===
- Royal charter formally establishing the Province of Massachusetts Bay (Oct 7). Major change in voter eligibility requirements from religious qualifications to land ownership, greatly enlarging the number of men eligible to vote. The charter guarantees freedom of worship for all Protestants, but not Catholics. Major change from election of senior government officials to crown appointment, including governor, lieutenant governor, and judges. The legislative assembly continued to be elected and was responsible for choosing members of the Governor's Council. The governor had veto power over laws passed by the assembly and appointments to the council. These rules differed in important ways from the royal charters enjoyed by the other New England colonies. The most important were that the assembly now possessed the power of appropriation, and that the council was locally chosen and not appointed by either the governor or the Crown, significantly weakening the governor's power.

=== 1693 ===
- College of William & Mary founded in Williamsburg, Virginia. Second institution of higher education in the colonies. Founding Fathers Thomas Jefferson and James Monroe attended.

=== 1695 ===
- Licensing Order of 1643 expires, ending state censorship in England. (April 12)

=== 1696 ===
- Navigation Acts create the Board of Trade and Admiralty Courts with jurisdiction over colonial affairs, including appointment of colonial officials and review of legislation. The Navigation Acts excludes foreigners from shipping to the English colonies and enumerates goods that must be re-exported through England rather than exported directly to foreign countries. (May 15)

=== 1699 ===
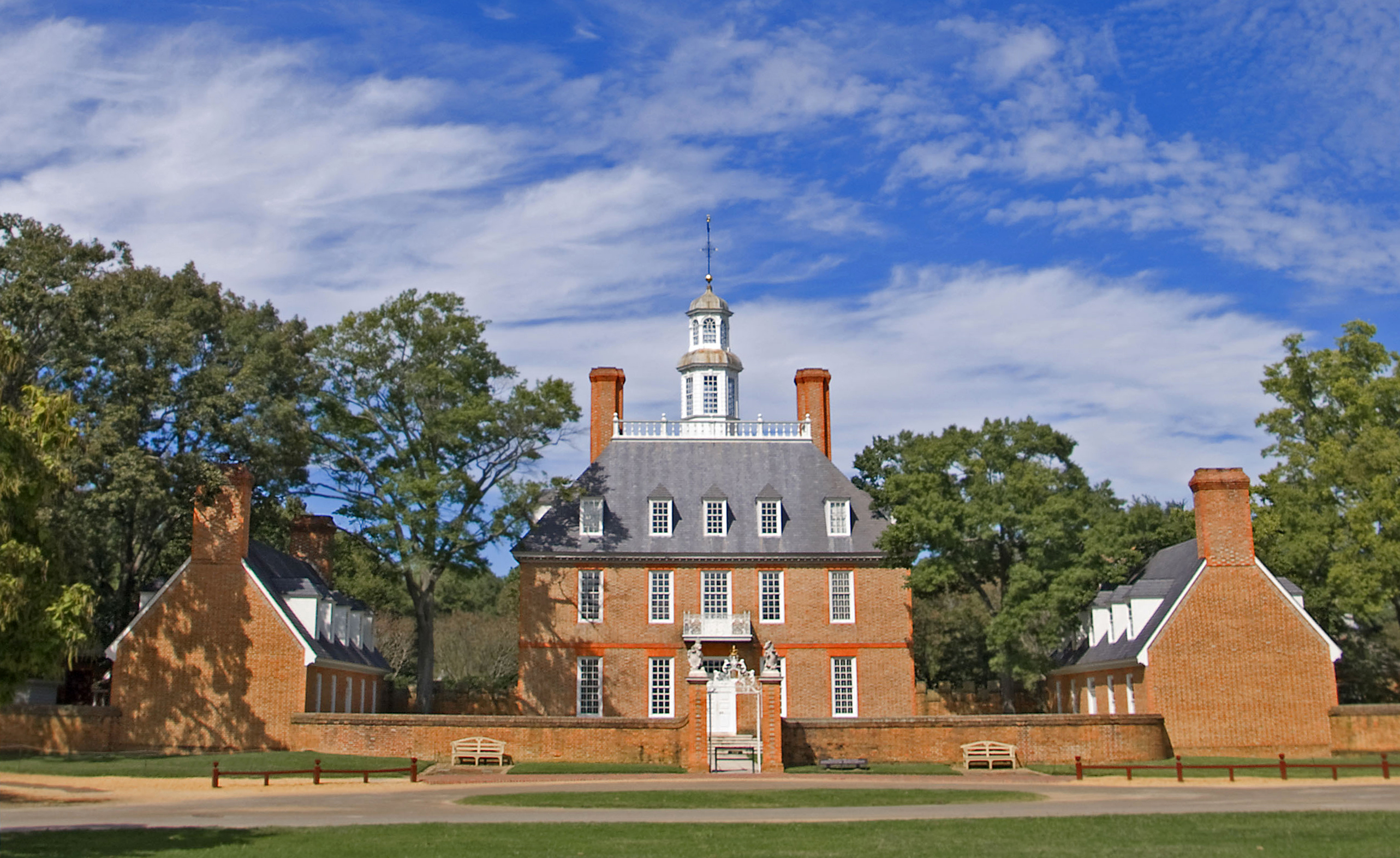
Governor's Palace, Williamsburg

- Williamsburg becomes the capital of Virginia, named after William III.

=== 1698-1700 ===
Flag of the Company of Scotland

- Darien scheme in Panama, a disastrous Scots colonization project. Barred by the English from participating in their colonies or trading with them, Scots embarked on colonization via the Company of Scotland Trading to Africa and the Indies, with large and small investors. When the colony failed, the financial impact in Scotland was horrendous. The failure made Scotland agree to the Act of Union (1707) that dissolved Scotland's parliament and joined with England under the Parliament at Westminster, forming Great Britain.

== 1700–1763 ==
=== 1700 ===
- Imports from colonies equal 20% of all imports to England; 10% of English manufactures are exported to the colonies. English settlers in North America reach 200,000; French settlement in New France is no more than 12,000. The rest of North America is claimed by a waning Spanish Empire.

=== 1701 ===
- Act of Settlement mandated that succession to the English and Irish crowns to Protestants only, specifically also disqualifying anyone who became a Roman Catholic, or who married one. It had the effect of deposing the remaining descendants of Charles I, other than his Protestant granddaughter Anne, as the next Protestant in line to inherit to inherit the throne.
- Yale College, New Haven, Connecticut founded. American Revolutionary War hero alumnus Nathan Hale.

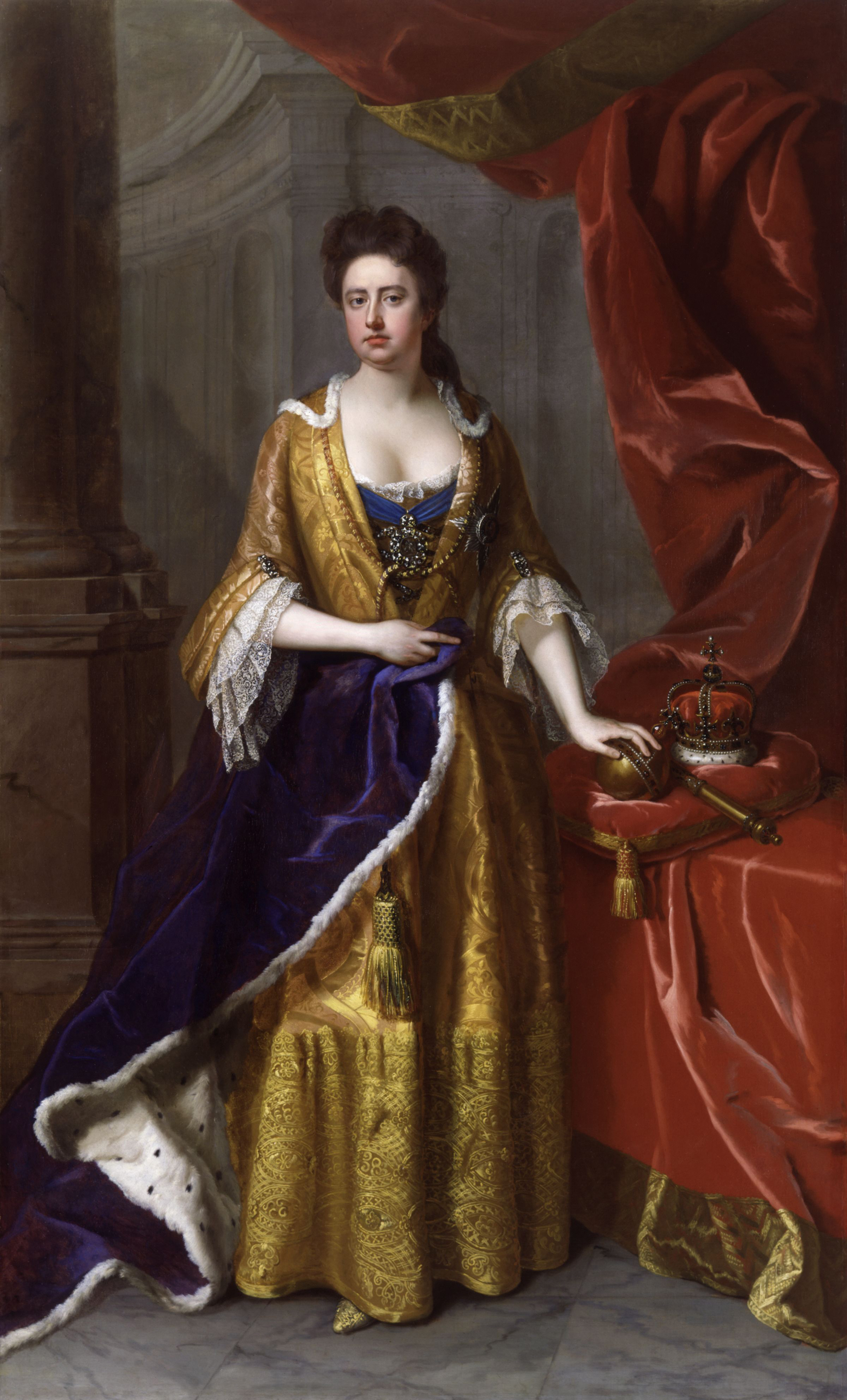
Anne, Queen of Great Britain and Ireland

=== 1702-1714, Queen Anne ===
- Anne, Queen of Great Britain was daughter of James II of England. Raised a Protestant, she was the last of the House of Stuart to rule England, Scotland, and Ireland. Despite 17 pregnancies, she did not birth a living heir. Her death triggered a succession crisis.

=== 1702 ===
- Queen Anne's War/War of the Spanish Succession prompts German migration to American colonies.

=== 1706 ===
- Benjamin Franklin born in Boston (January 17), oldest of the Founding Fathers
- Board of Trade increases its power by no longer requiring Crown approval before implementing types of colonial legislation.

=== 1707 ===
- Acts of Union 1707, two acts of Parliament, one by the Parliament of Scotland in March 1707, followed shortly thereafter by an equivalent act of the Parliament of England, followed by a treaty, which politically joined the Kingdom of England and Kingdom of Scotland into a single "political state" named Great Britain, with Queen Anne as its sovereign. The English and Scottish acts of ratification took effect on 1 May 1707, creating the new kingdom, with its parliament based in the Palace of Westminster.

=== 1710 ===
- British conquest of French Acadia by British regulars and provincial forces

=== 1713 ===
- French settlement on Isle Saint Jean, a strategic location where the Fortress of Louisbourg is constructed, the naval base for the French fleet, close to the Gulf of St Lawrence and the fishing grounds of Newfoundland.

=== 1714-1727, George I ===
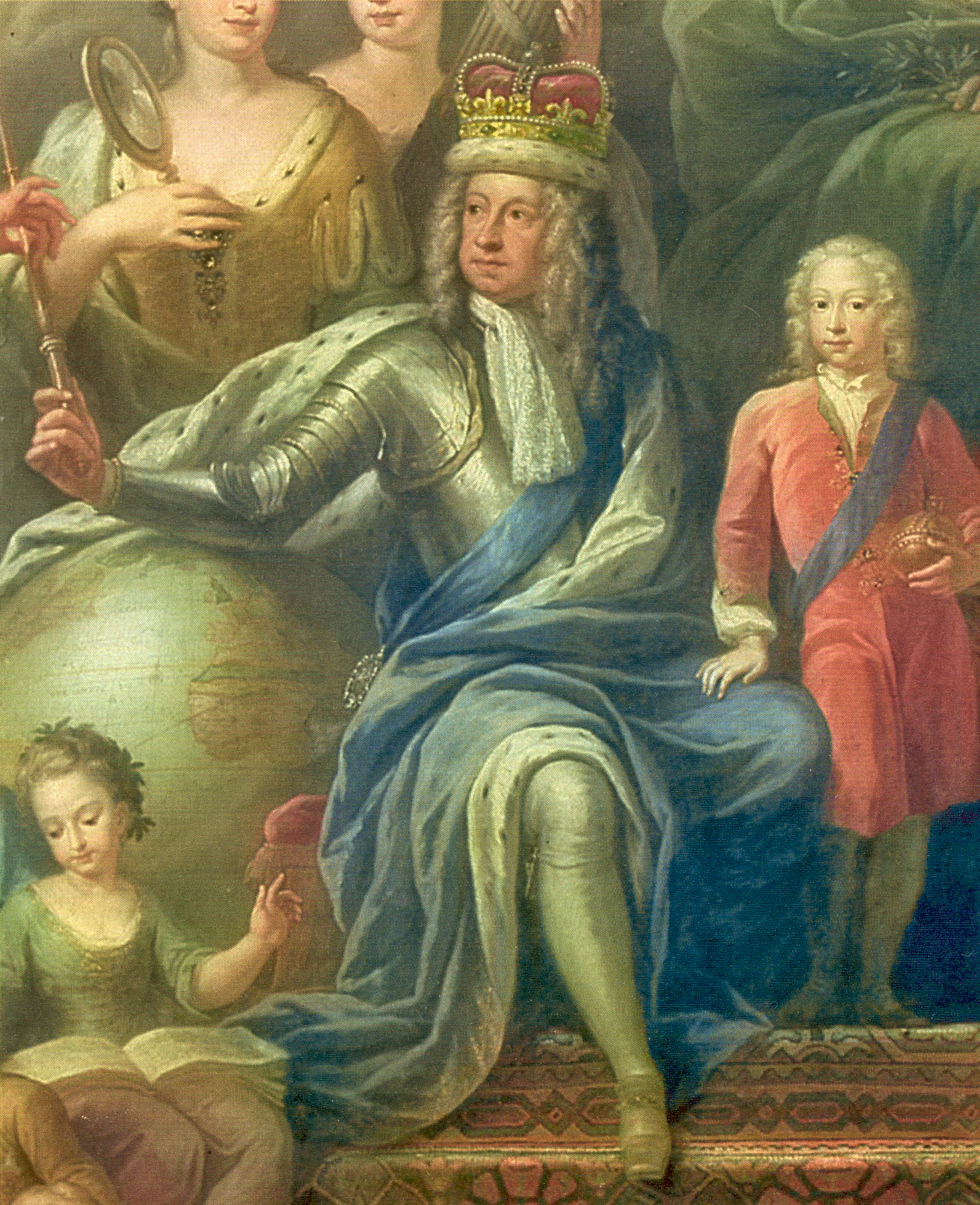
George I

- George I of Great Britain of the German state of Hanover is chosen monarch for Great Britain. Despite his being a German-speaking, fifty-year old ruler of a small Central Europe state, but is Protestant, a Lutheran, and considered a better alternative to the Catholic Stuart pretender to the throne, resident in France. George I came with a living male heir, allaying fears of yet another dynastic crisis.

=== 1718 ===
- American ships allowed in the West Indies; growth of sugar trade and rum manufacture in New England.

=== 1721 ===
- Boston smallpox inoculation debate; for inoculation was Cotton Mather

=== 1722 ===
- Thomas Pownall, British colonial administrator sympathetic to the colonies, born (September 4)
- Samuel Adams, Founding Father born in Massachusetts (September 27)

=== 1727-1760, George II ===
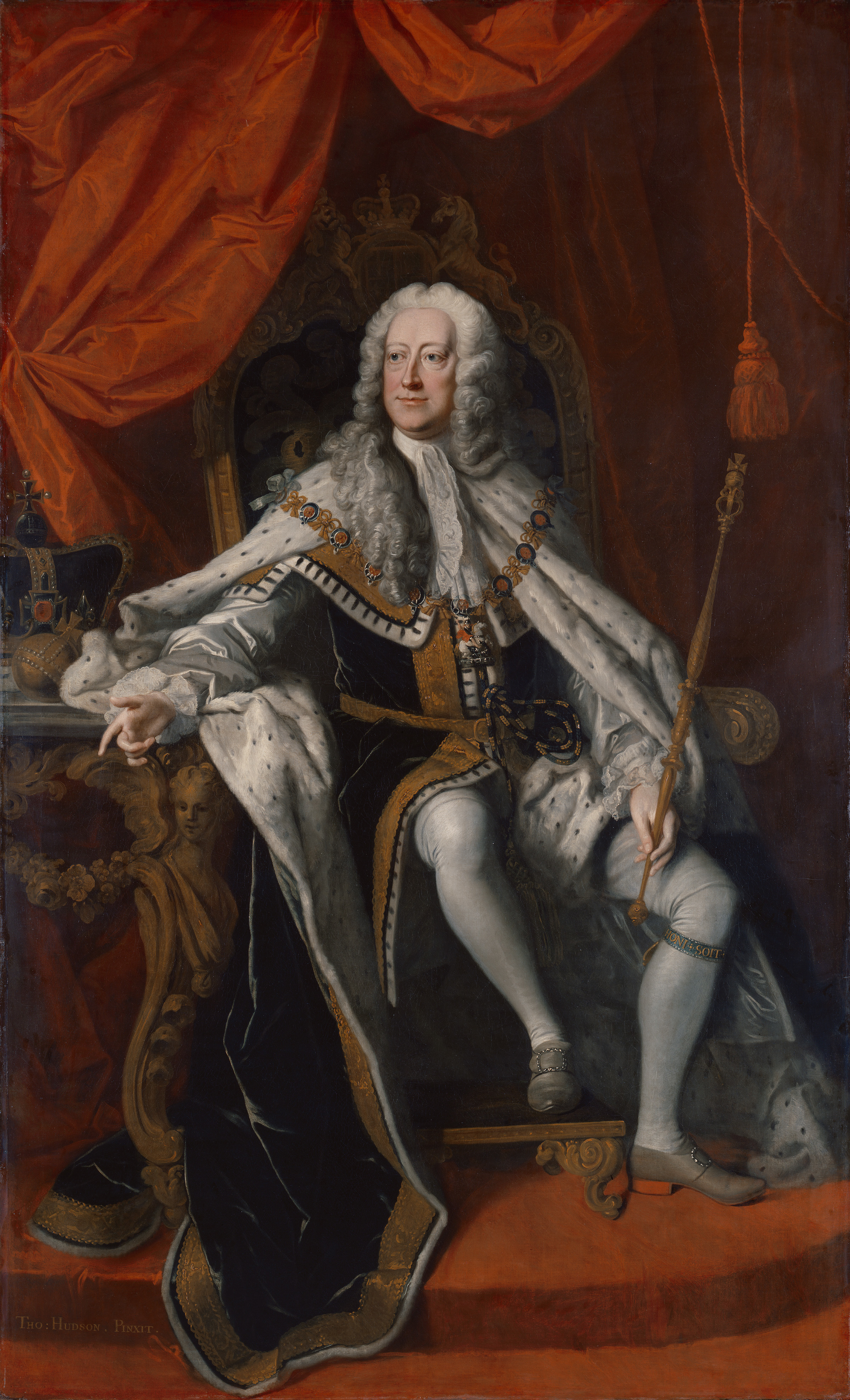
George II

- George II of Great Britain succeeds to the throne.

=== 1732 ===
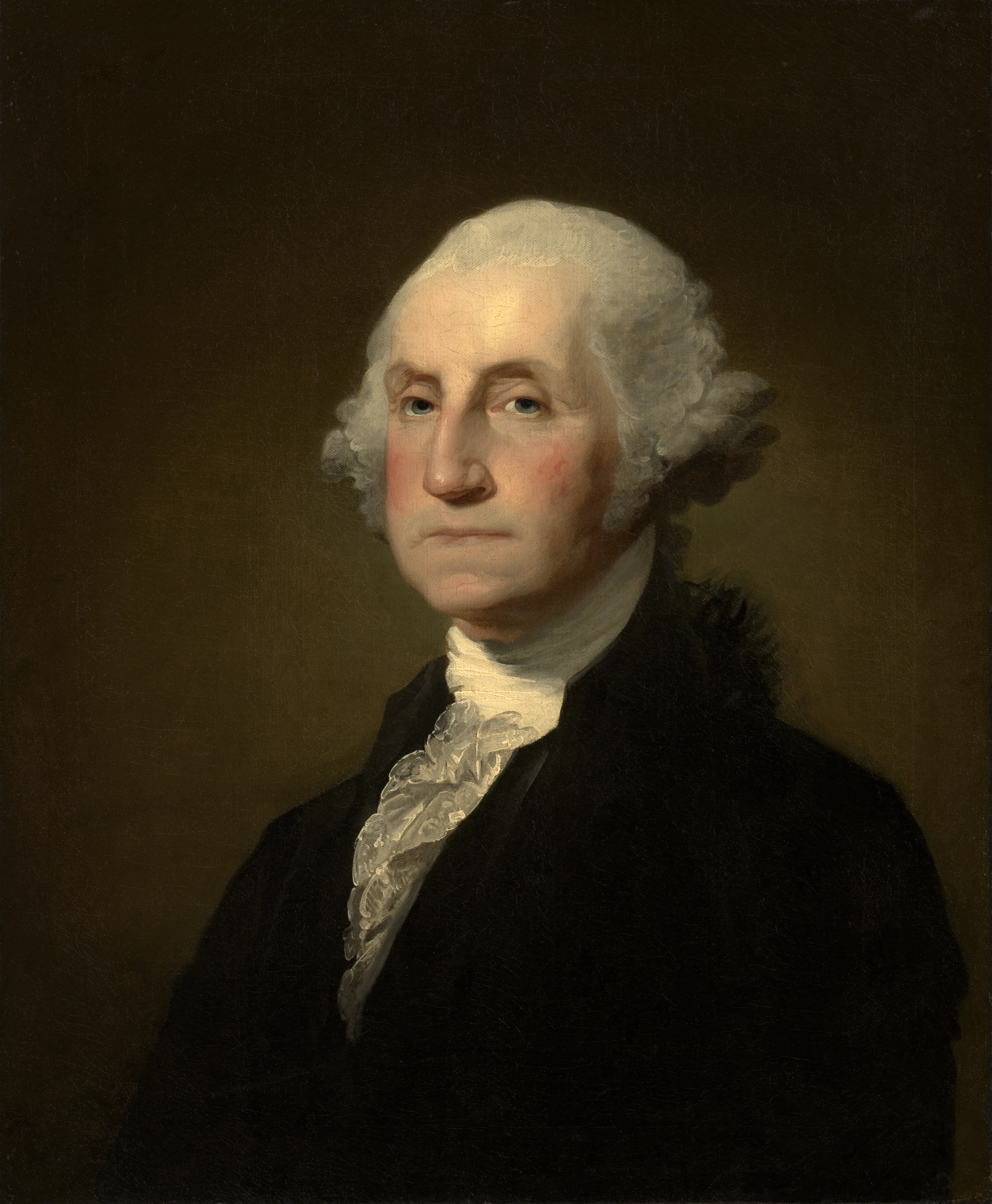
George Washington

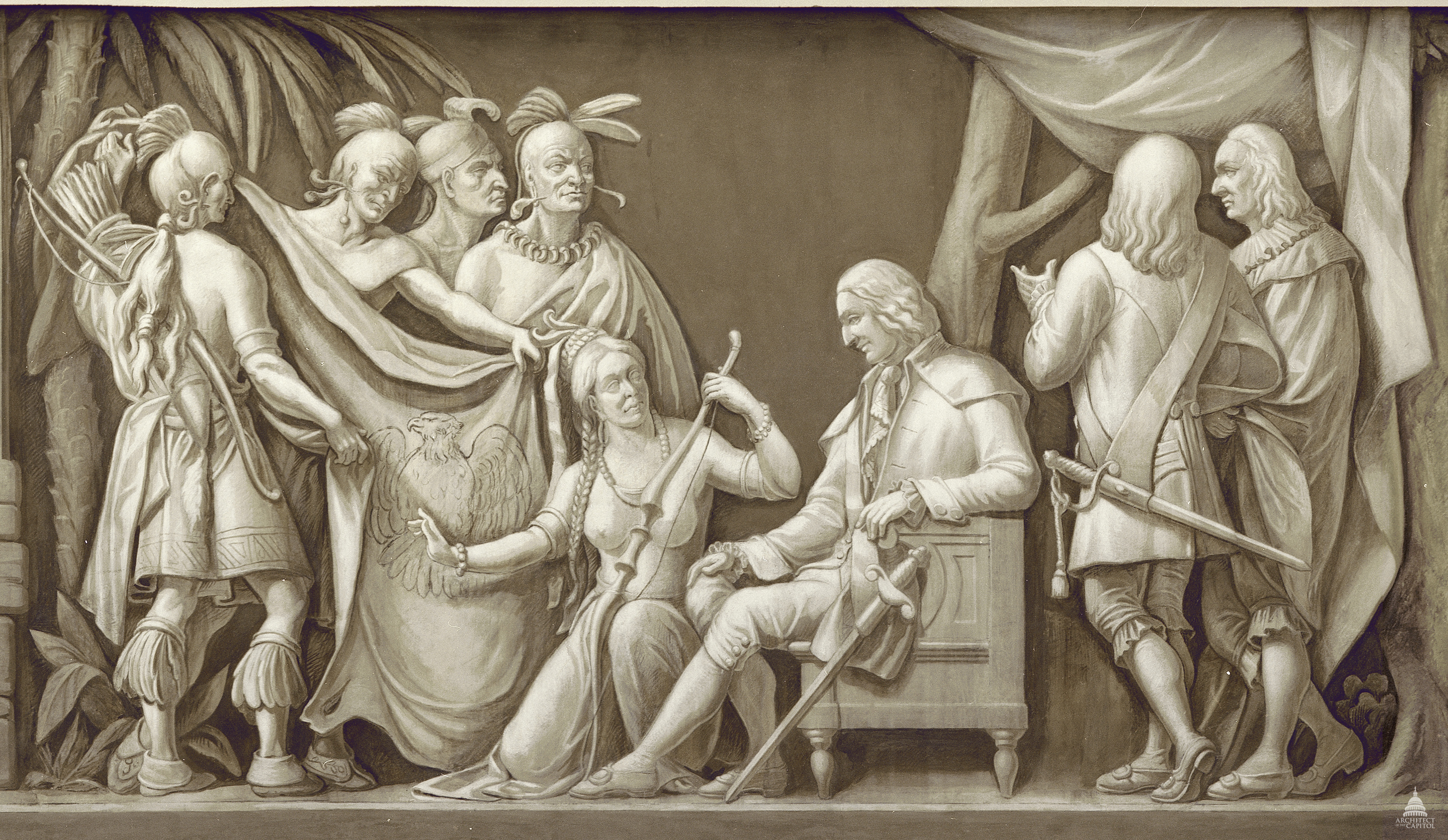
Governor of Georgia makes peace with the Muskogee natives

- Founding Father George Washington born in Virginia (Feb. 22)
- Georgia Colony royal charter granted to James Oglethorpe by George II of Great Britain, to be a buffer zone between the Carolinas and Spanish Florida

=== 1733 ===
- Savannah, Georgia founded by James Oglethorpe
- Molasses Act passed by Parliament, affecting the colonial molasses trade

=== 1735 ===
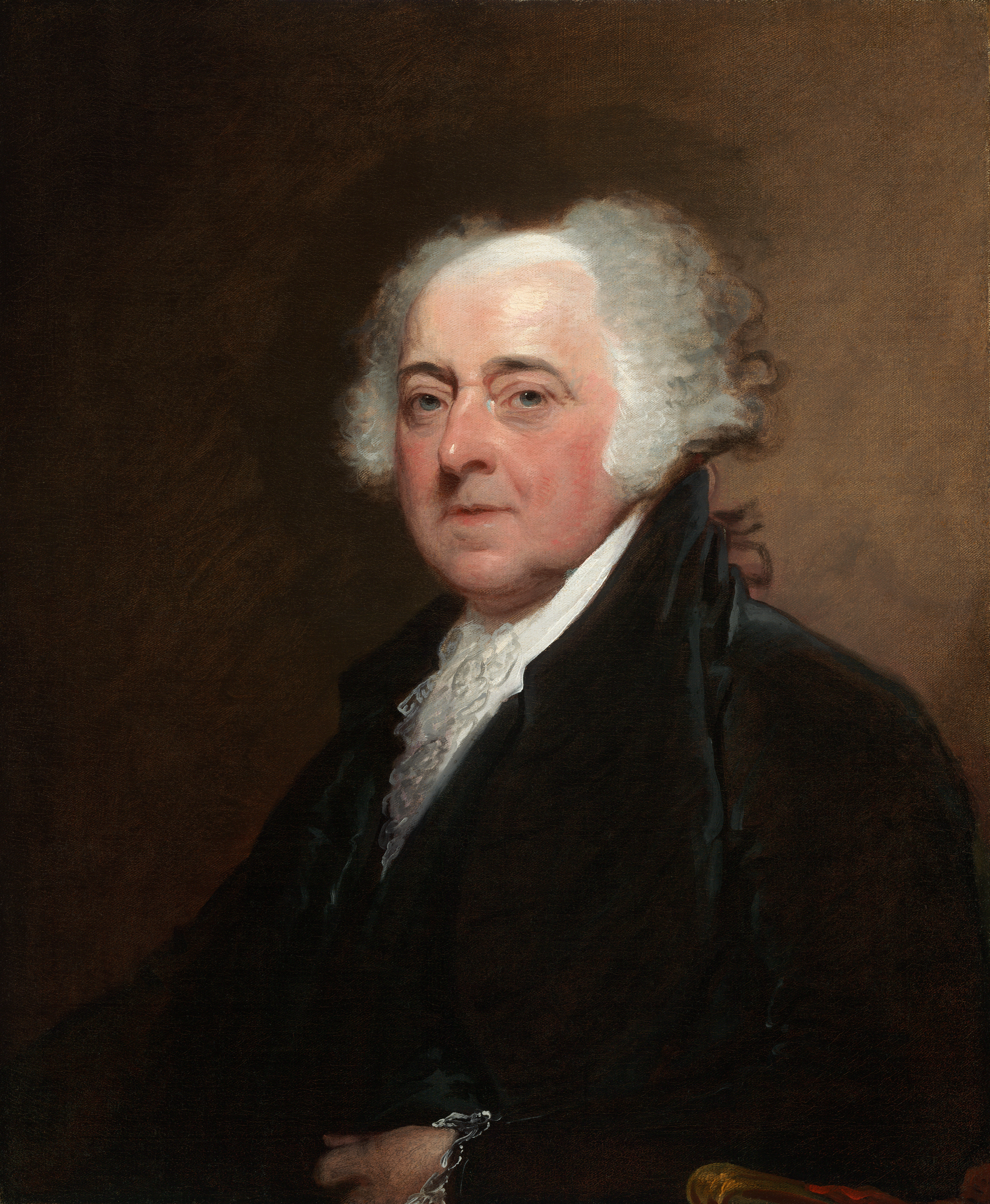
John Adams

- Founding Father John Adams born in Massachusetts (October 30)

=== 1739 ===
- Stono Rebellion, South Carolina slave insurrection, largest in the colonial era.

=== 1739-1748 ===
- War of Jenkins' Ear was a conflict between Great Britain and Spain. Most of the fighting took place in New Granada and the Caribbean Sea, with major operations largely ended by 1742. The conflict is considered to be related to the War of the Austrian Succession (1740–1748).

=== 1740 ===
- Negro Act of 1740 passed by the South Carolina Assembly in the wake of the Stono Rebellion
- Plantation Act 1740 by Parliament defined the conditions under which Christian aliens could become naturalized subjects of the British crown.

=== 1742 ===
- Invasion of Georgia, Spanish forces based in Florida attempt to seize and occupy disputed territory held by the British colony of Georgia. Local British forces under the command of the Governor James Oglethorpe rallied and defeated the Spaniards at the Battle of Bloody Marsh and the Battle of Gully Hole Creek, forcing them to withdraw. Britain's ownership of Georgia was formally recognized by Spain in the subsequent Treaty of Madrid.

=== 1743 ===
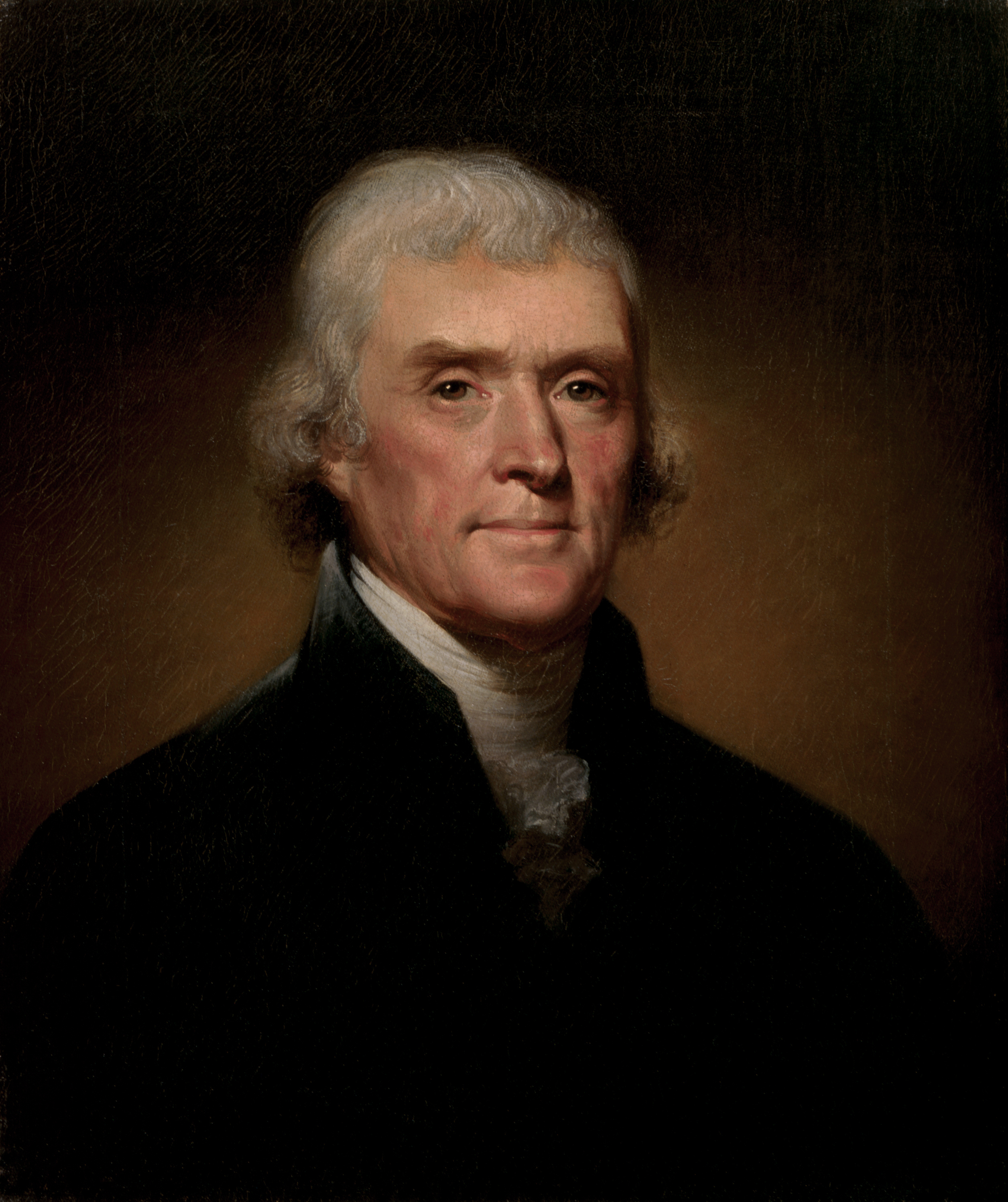
Thomas Jefferson

- Founding Father Thomas Jefferson born in Virginia, (April 13)

=== 1744-1748 ===
British and British American military besiege the French at Louisbourg, 1745

- King George's War in North America formed part of the War of the Austrian Succession (1740–1748). It was the third of the four French and Indian Wars, taking place primarily in the British provinces of New York, Massachusetts Bay, including Maine, New Hampshire (which included Vermont at the time), and Nova Scotia. Its most significant action was an expedition organized by Massachusetts Governor William Shirley that besieged and ultimately captured the French fortress of Louisbourg, on Cape Breton Island in Nova Scotia.

=== 1746 ===
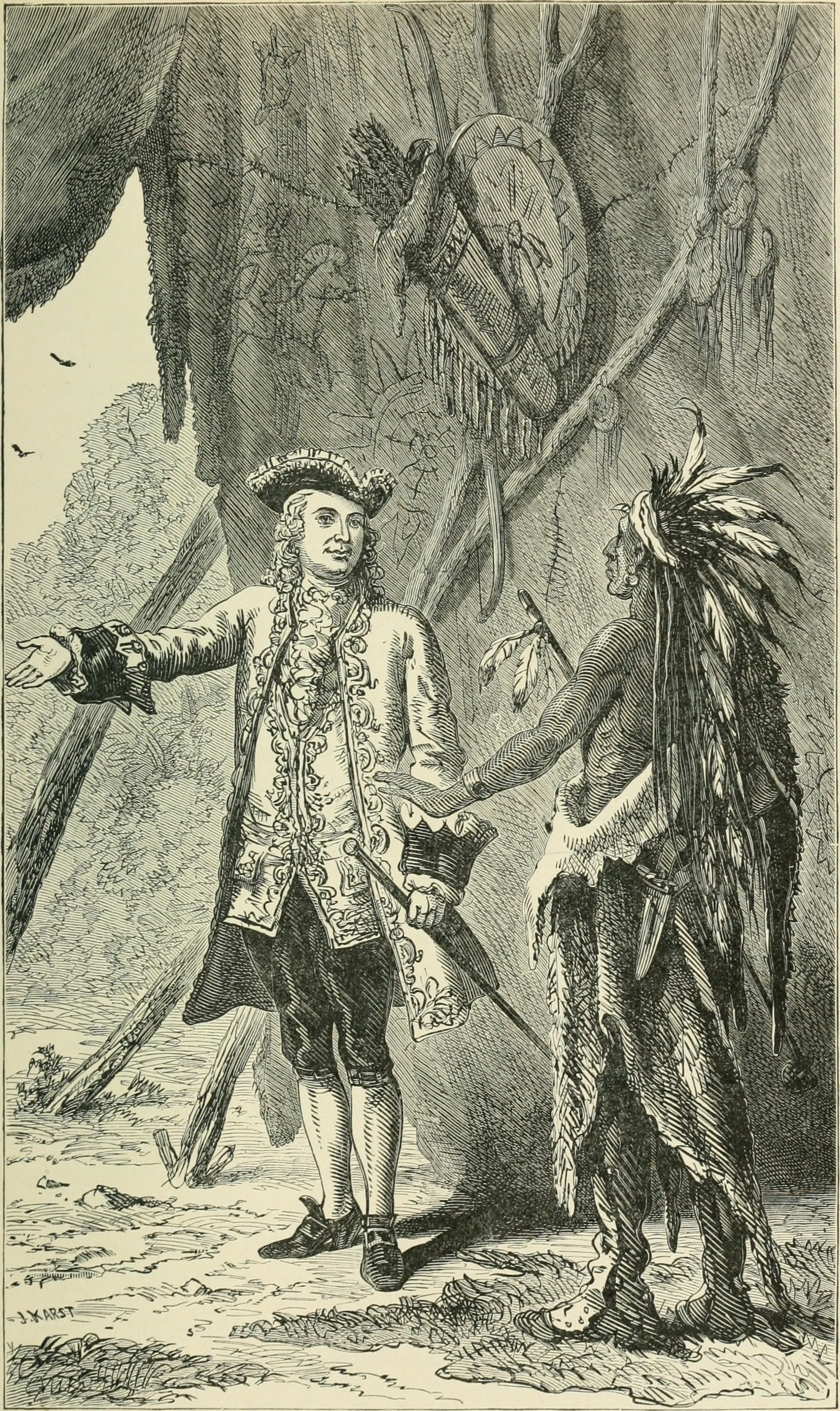
Sir Wm. Johnson and Mohawk leader, 19thc print

- College of New Jersey, (now Princeton University). Founding Fathers alumni James Madison, Aaron Burr, Benjamin Rush
- Sir William Johnson becomes the New York colony's sole agent to the Iroquois; he cultivates longterm relations with the Native Americans, including as allies in war, mutually beneficial trade.

=== 1747 ===
- Ohio Company of Virginia formed, land speculation company that seeks profit from future dispossession of Native lands

=== 1748 ===
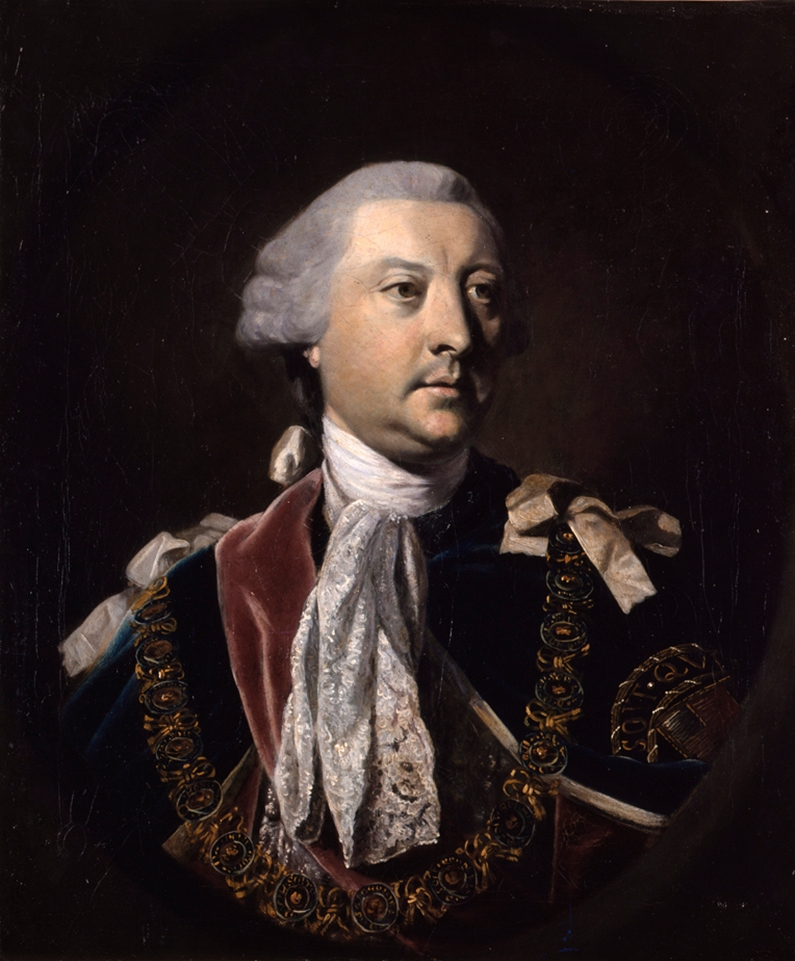
Lord Halifax

- Lord Halifax appointed head of the British Board of Trade, the only royal office dealing solely with the American colonies; attempts to end previous de facto policy of salutary neglect of colonial affairs, allowing much local autonomy and loose oversight of royal officials. Implementation of a new, unitary and restrictive approach to royal control largely a failure, but renewed in 1763, after the Seven Years' War, called in colonial America the French and Indian War
- Treaty of Aix-la-Chapelle ends the War of the Austrian Succession; territory settlement returns Fortress of Louisbourg to France, captured in 1745 by British regular troops and troops from Massachusetts.

=== 1749 ===
- Parliament passes the Currency Bill; includes a clause declaring that "any colonial legislative enactments contrary to [government] instructions null and void"; pushback from colonial agents and government reserved this for "future consideration."
- Halifax is founded in a deepwater Atlantic inlet at the mandate of the British Board of Trade, becomes the capital of Nova Scotia from Annapolis Royal, soon becomes the base for the Royal Navy in North America (June 21).

=== 1751 ===
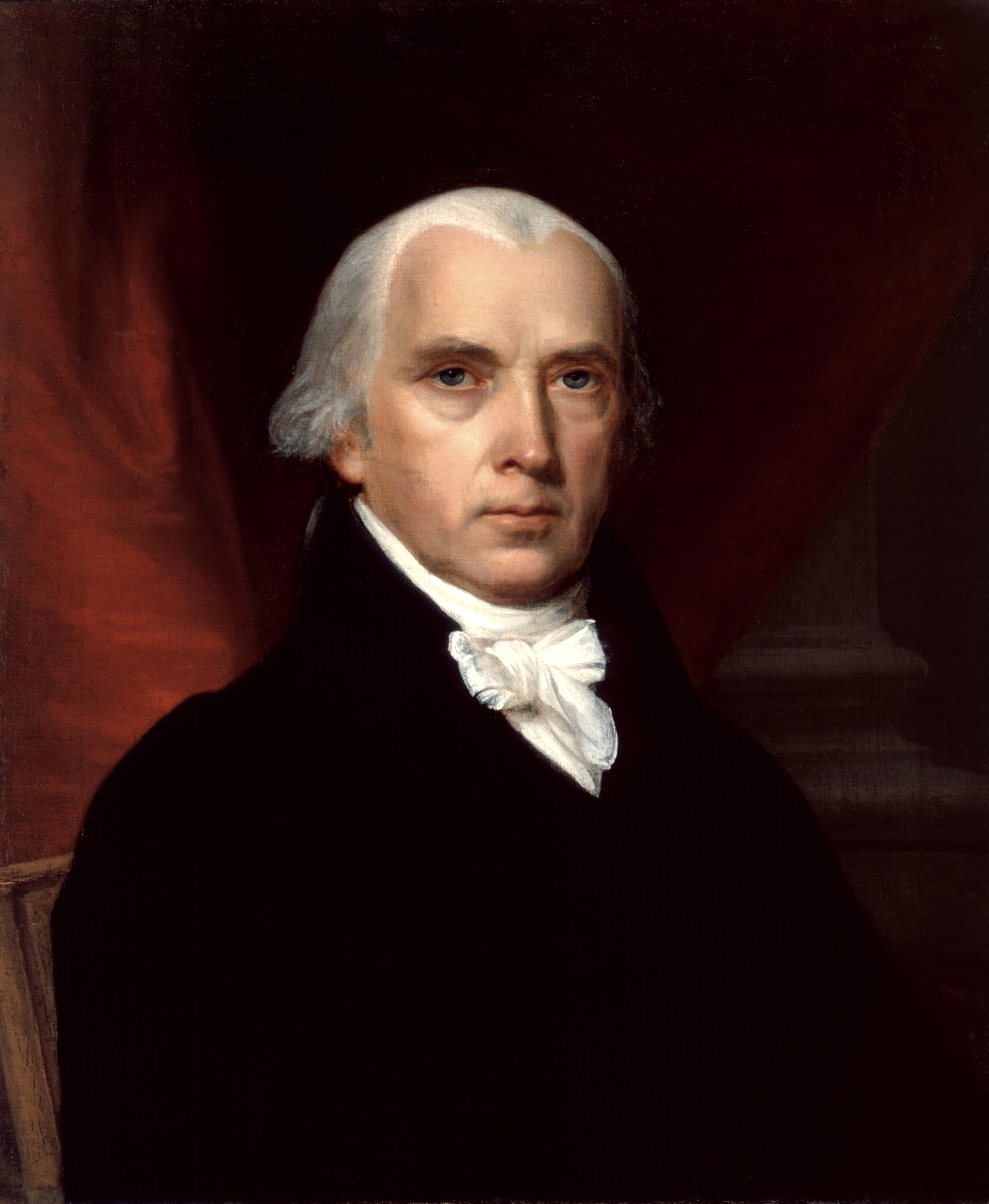
James Madison

- James Madison born in Virginia (March 16).

=== 1754-1763 ===
North America circa 1750

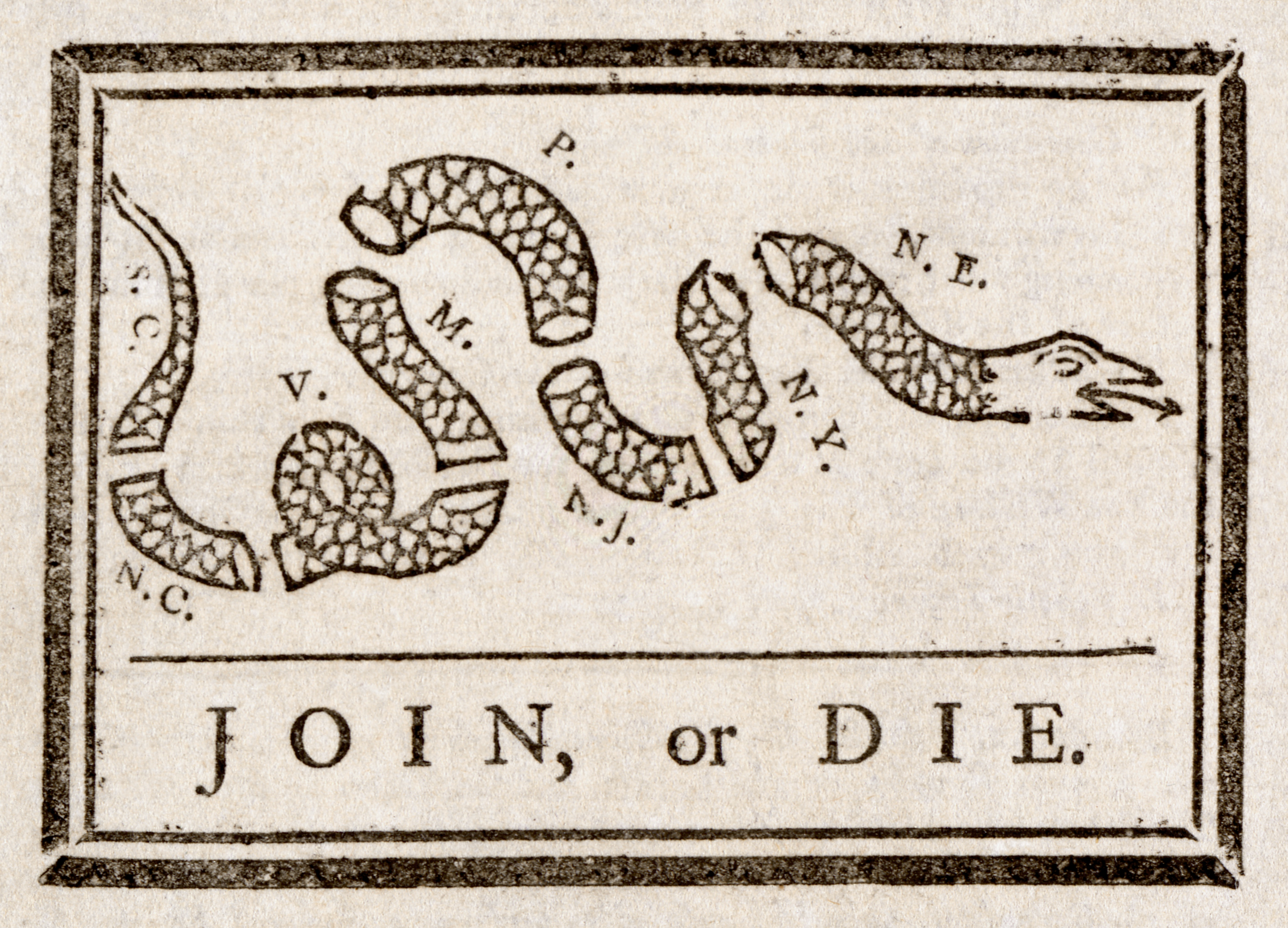
Join, or Die woodcut by Benjamin Franklin, 1754

- French and Indian War (1754–1763), a nine-year conflict, the North American portion of the Seven Years' War, a global conflict fought between European powers, that began on the fringes of the British and French empires in North America. Colonial militias play a role; Virginia planter, Col. George Washington makes a name for himself as a military leader

=== 1754 ===
- Albany Congress, the first time in the 18th century that American colonial representatives meet to discuss some manner of formal union; attempts to gain Iroquois support (June 18 – July 11)
- King's College founded New York City, now Columbia University; Founding Fathers alumni Alexander Hamilton, John Jay, Robert R. Livingston, Gouverneur Morris, Hercules Mulligan

=== 1755 ===
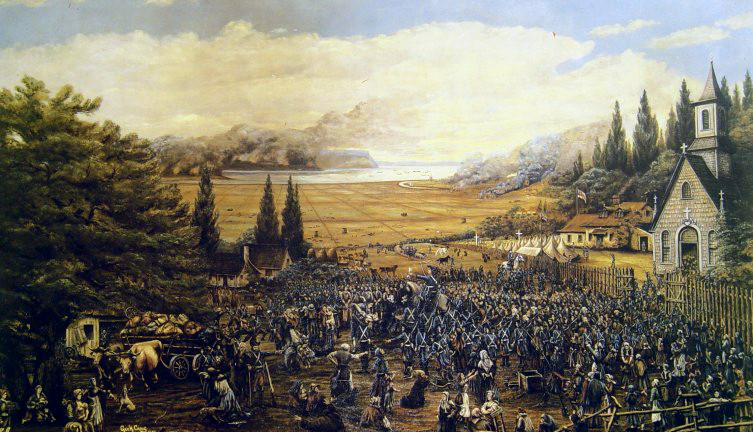
British expulsion of the Acadians

- British expulsion of French Catholic Acadians from Nova Scotia, a hardening of British colonial policy; thousands who had not taken the loyalty oath to the British crown after the British conquest were summarily uprooted, removing a military vulnerability for the British and making lands available for English and Scots settlers.

Mitchell Map of North America

- The Mitchell Map, Map of the British and French Dominions in North America is published by cartographer John Mitchell, showing the western boundaries of English colonies extending beyond far past Mississippi River; political assertion by Britain of territory it disputed with France; used in the treaty negotiations ending the Revolutionary War in 1783.
- College of Philadelphia later named University of Pennsylvania founded by Benjamin Franklin, who remained a trustee until his death.

=== 1757 ===
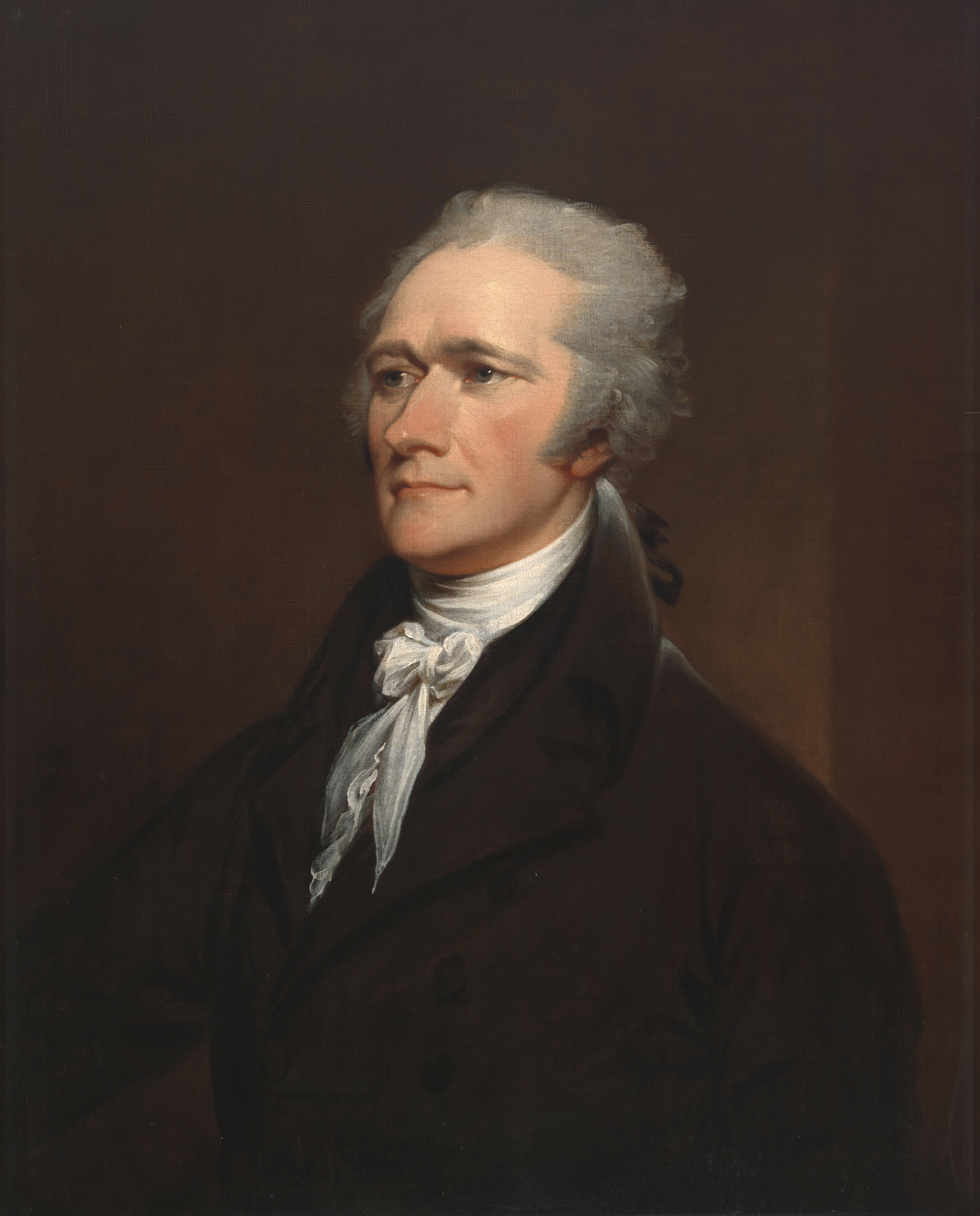
Alexander Hamilton

- Prime Minister William Pitt commits to all-out effort in the Seven Years' War, incurring massive debt for the royal treasury
- Alexander Hamilton born British Caribbean island of Nevis (January 11)

=== 1759–60 ===
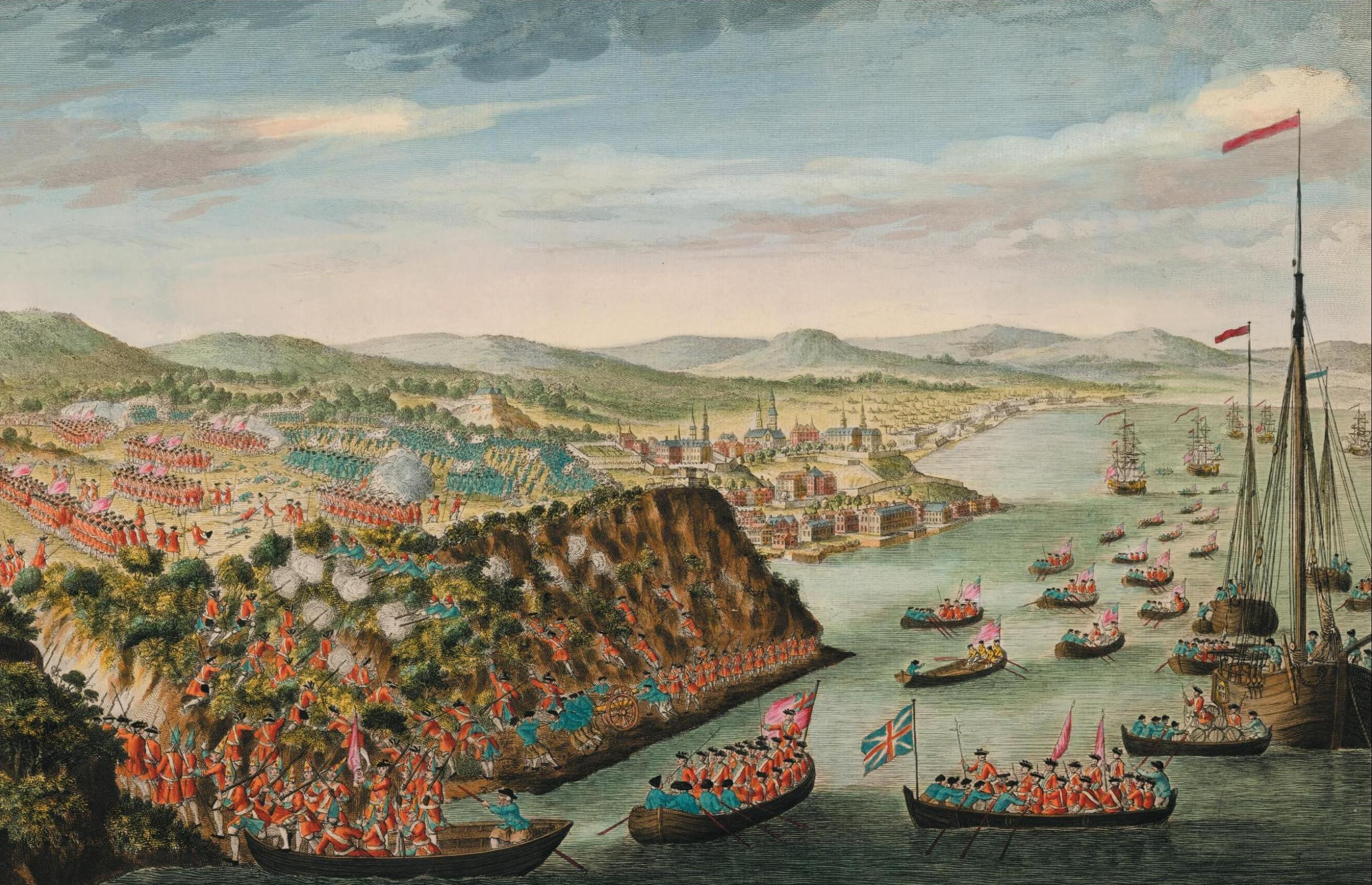
After a campaign of three months British forces captured Quebec City after the Battle of the Plains of Abraham.

- British Army defeats French Army in New France
  - Quebec, capital of New France falls to the British
  - Montreal falls to the British
  - Pierre de Rigaud, Governor of New France, capitulates to Field Marshal Jeffrey Amherst. This ends most fighting in North America between France and Great Britain in the French and Indian War. Amherst becomes the first British Governor-General of territories that would later become Canada plus lands (Ohio Country and Illinois Country) west of the American Colonies (September 8)

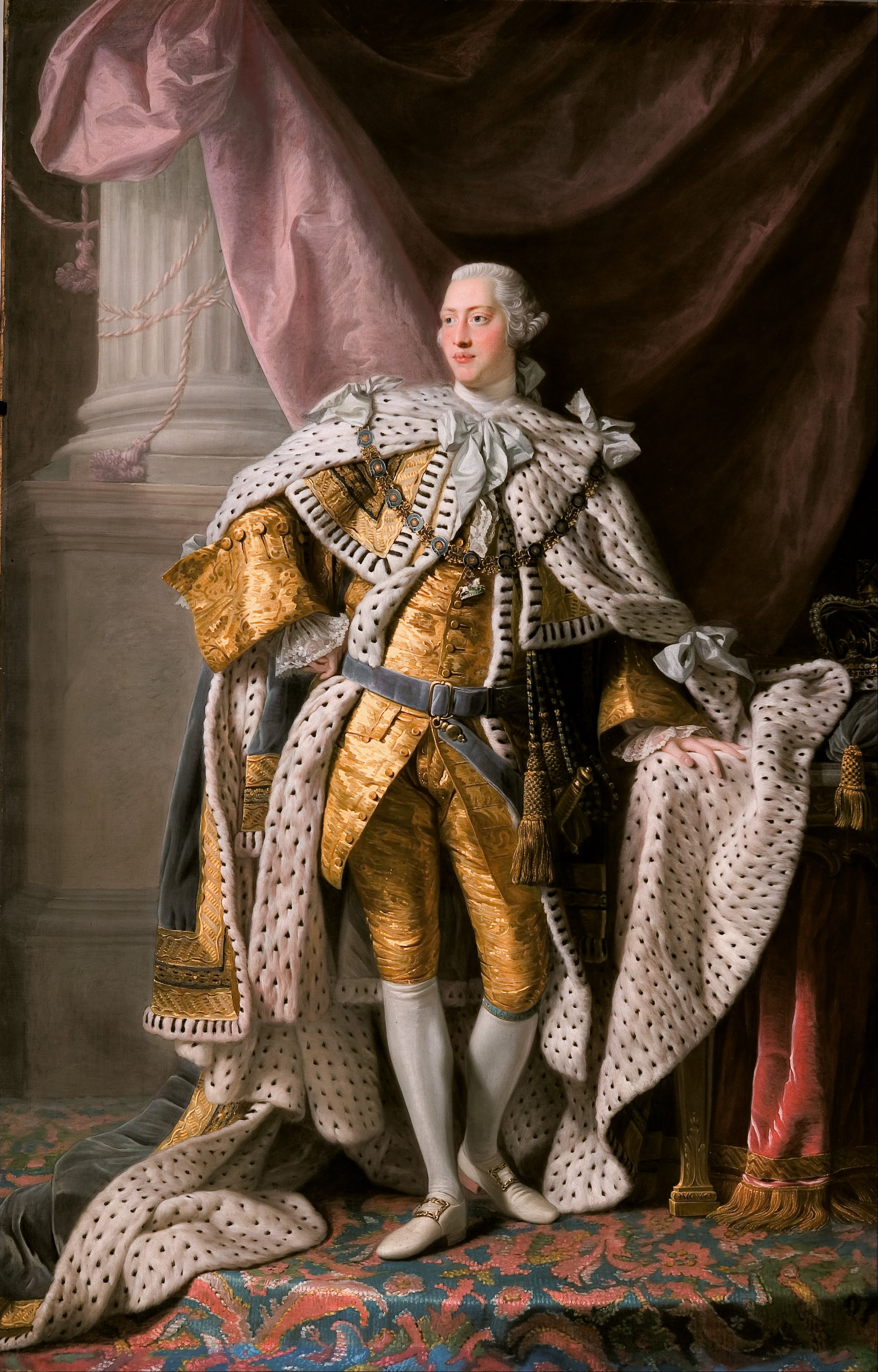
George III

=== 1760 ===
- King George II of Great Britain dies, age 77.

=== 1760s ===
- New England Planters were settlers in Nova Scotia, migrated at the in invitation of the governor and took over lands of the French Catholic Acadians following their forced expulsion; the Planters were Protestants, the first major group of English-speaking immigrants in Canada who did not come directly from Great Britain.

=== 1760-1820, George III ===
- George III, George II's grandson, age 22, succeeds to the throne. (October 25) He is the first of the Hanoverian monarchs to be born in Britain and speak English as his native tongue. His reign began during the Seven Years' War and continued through the entirety of the American War of Independence, the Napoleonic Wars, and the War of 1812.

=== 1760 ===
- George III on the first day of his reign declares he wants an end to the war, since he saw it benefiting Hanover's interests in Europe, while Britain was being ruined financially by the expense of the war, vastly increasing the national debt.

== 1762 ==
- James Otis Jr. publishes A Vindication of the Conduct of the House of Representatives, criticizing expenditures not sanctioned by the colonial legislature, the foundation of his theory that taxes can be charged only by a representative government, summarized as "no taxation without representation", a key argument of revolutionary rhetoric.

== 1763 ==
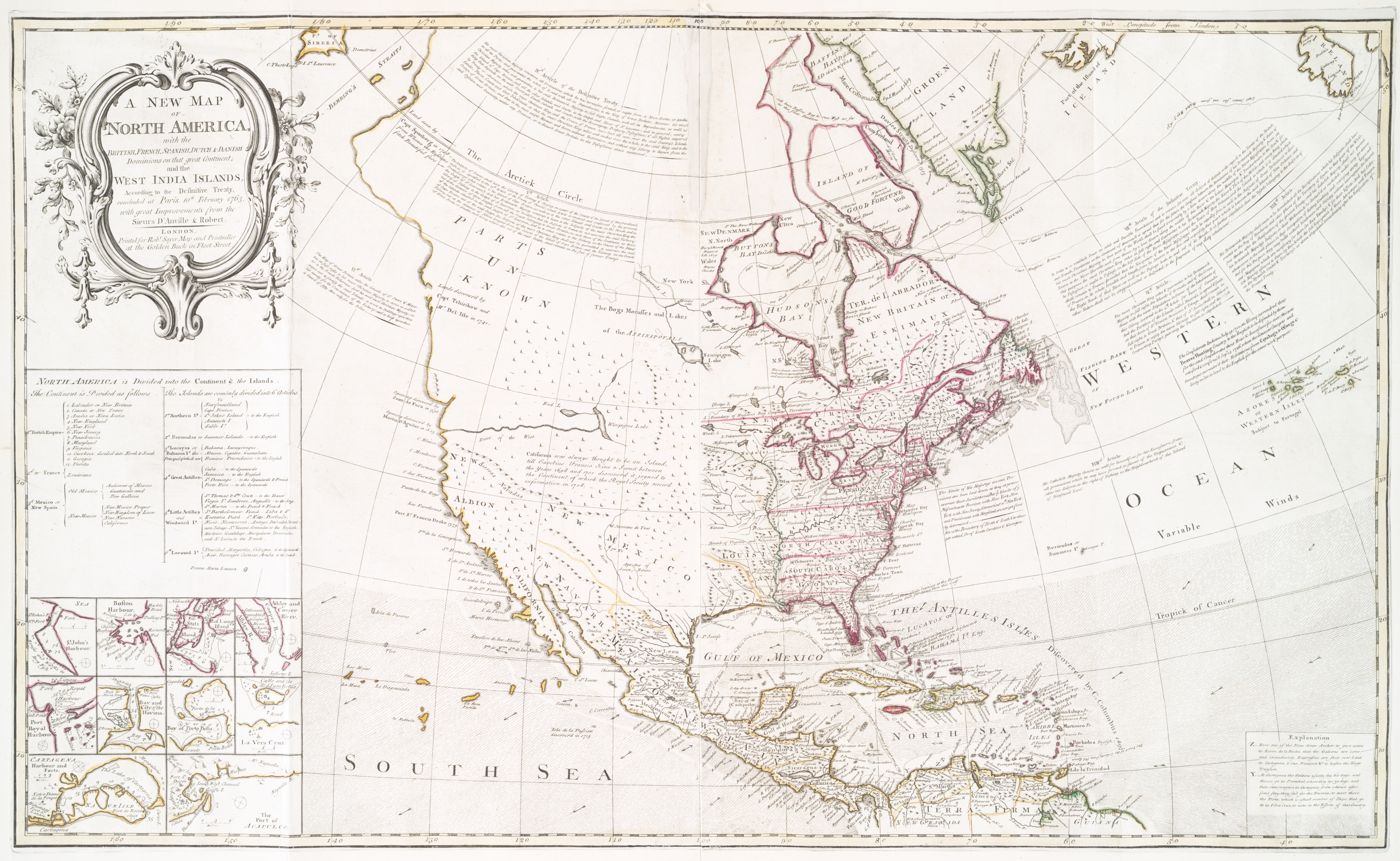
New map of North America drawn following the Treaty of Paris (1763)

- The Treaty of Paris (February 10) ends the Seven Years' War (1756–1763), called in the United States the French and Indian War (1754–1763). France cedes most of its territories in North America to Great Britain, but Louisiana west of the Mississippi River is ceded to Spain. France also recognized the sovereignty of Britain over the islands of Dominica, Grenada, Saint Vincent and the Grenadines, and Tobago. George III is dissatisfied with the terms of the treaty, which he deems favorable to the losing powers France and Spain rather than the winner, Great Britain.
- Charles Townshend appointed President of the Board of Trade

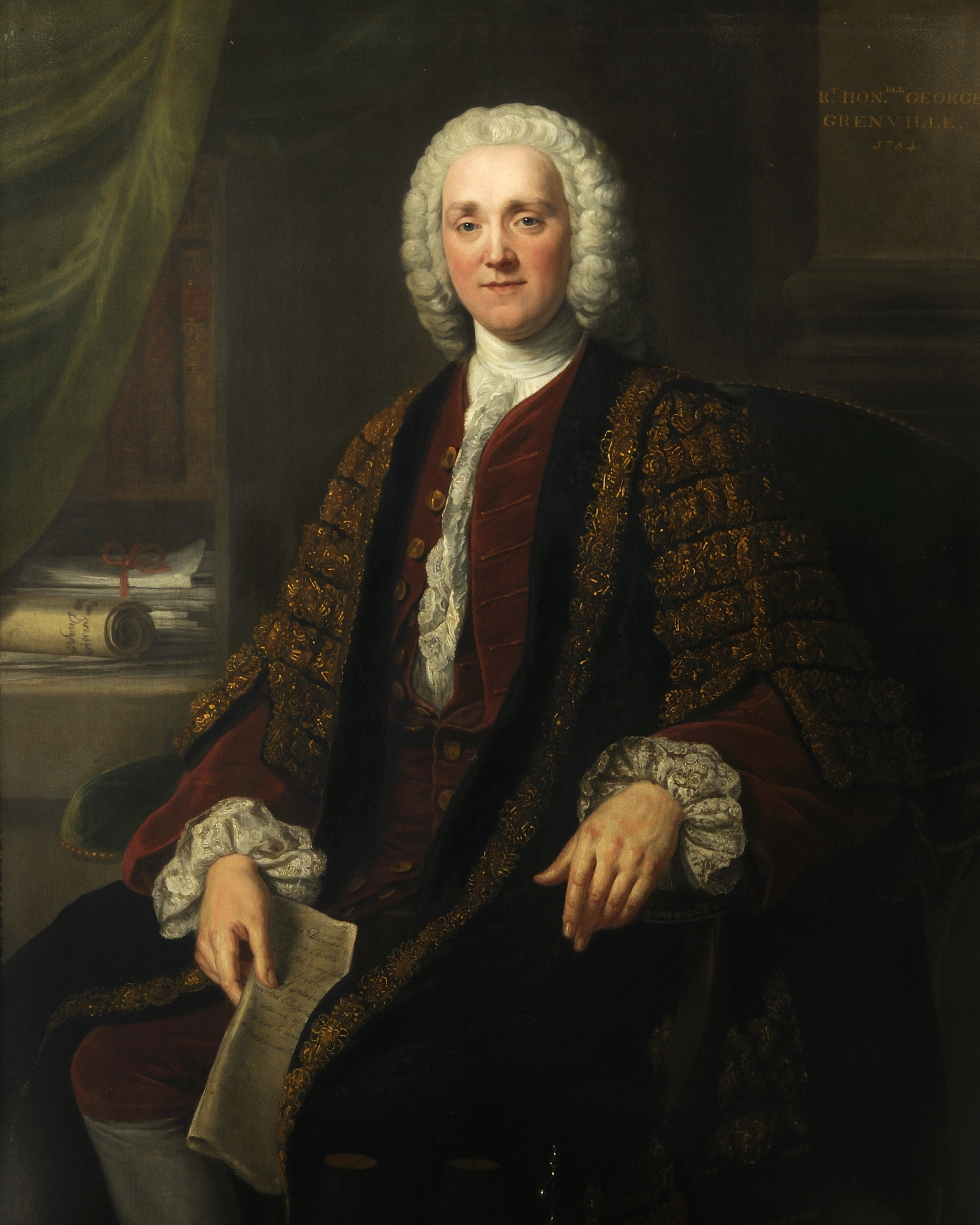
Geo. Grenville

- George Grenville becomes the Prime Minister (April 16) – a hardliner, who implemented policies to make the colonies contribute to paying off the massive debt from the Seven Years' War and assert Parliament's authority over the colonies.

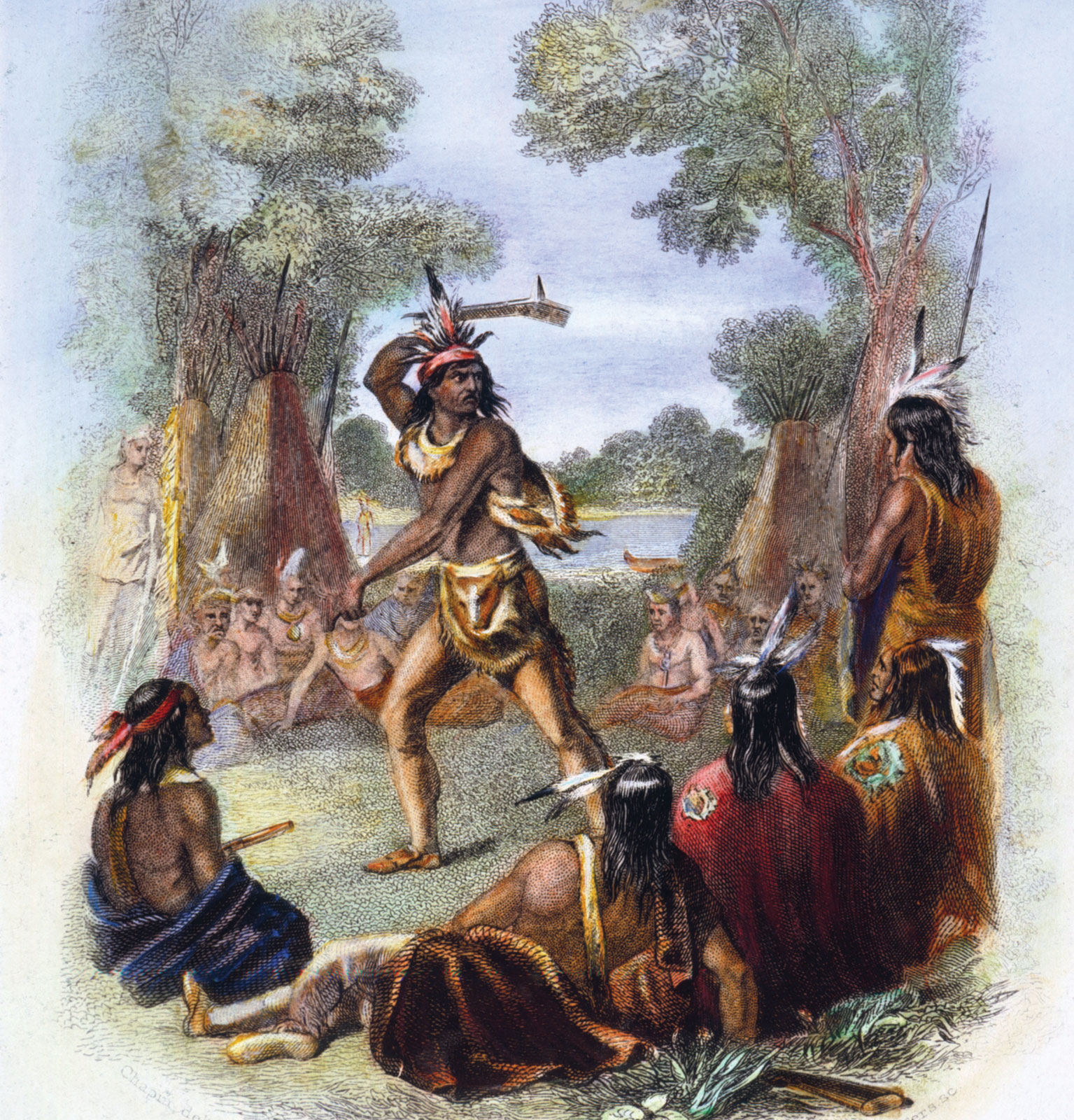
Pontiac and war council

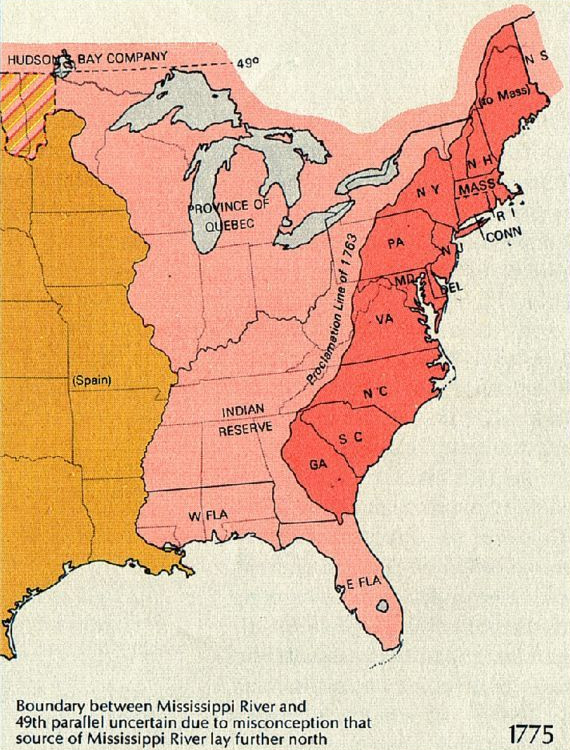
Eastern North America in 1775, including the British Province of Quebec (pink), Indian Reserve (pink), and areas open to European-American settlement in the 13 Colonies along the Atlantic coast (red), plus the westward border established by the Royal Proclamation of 1763 and present–day state borders

- Pontiac's War is launched by a Native American confederation in the Great Lakes region under the overall command of the eponymous Ottawa chief. Previously allied with France, they were dissatisfied by the policies of the British under Amherst (April 25, 1763 – July 25, 1766)
- Royal Proclamation of 1763 establishes royal control in territories newly ceded by France, land to which some English colonies claim. To prevent further violence between White settlers and Native Americans, the Proclamation sets a western boundary on the American colonies (October 7). American colonies view this as a limitation on their previous rights to continue expansion westward that encroached on Native American territory.
- Navigation Acts re-enforced by George Grenville as a part of his attempt to reassert unified economic control over the British Empire following the Seven Years' War
- Gen. Thomas Gage becomes Commander-in-Chief of British forces in North America, serving until 1775.
- Paxton "boys"', white settlers in western Pennsylvania, massacre peaceful Conestoga Native Americans and march on Philadelphia (Dec. 13-27)

== 1764 ==
- A Remonstrance from the Pennsylvania Frontier sent by disgruntled white settlers to Pennsylvania's governor and assembly (Feb. 13)
- Sugar Act also known as the American Duties Act (April 5), intended to raise revenues, and the Currency Act (September 1), prohibiting the colonies from issuing paper money, are passed by Parliament. These Acts, coming during the economic slump that followed the French and Indian War, required that colonists contribute to paying off the war debt and led to colonial protests. Publications against these acts include Otis's Rights of the British Colonists Asserted and Proved. Thomas Pownall recommends a more effective colonial policy in The Administration of the Colonies.
- Massachusetts assembly establishes the first official committee of correspondence (June 13)
- Board of Trade issues a plan for cooperation with Native American groups, secures formal treaties with 11 northern indigenous groups (July 10)
- Boston merchants agree on non-importation to counter the Sugar Act (August) Other colonies follow.

== 1765 ==
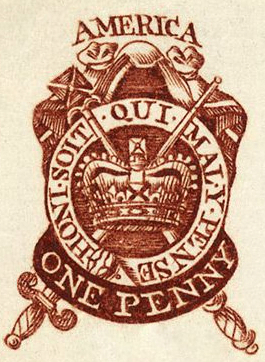
Official one-penny stamp

- Bankruptcy of Boston private banker and military contractor Nathaniel Wheelwright, who fled to Guadaloupe, leaving £170,000 in unpaid debts resulting in financial disaster for Boston's economy.

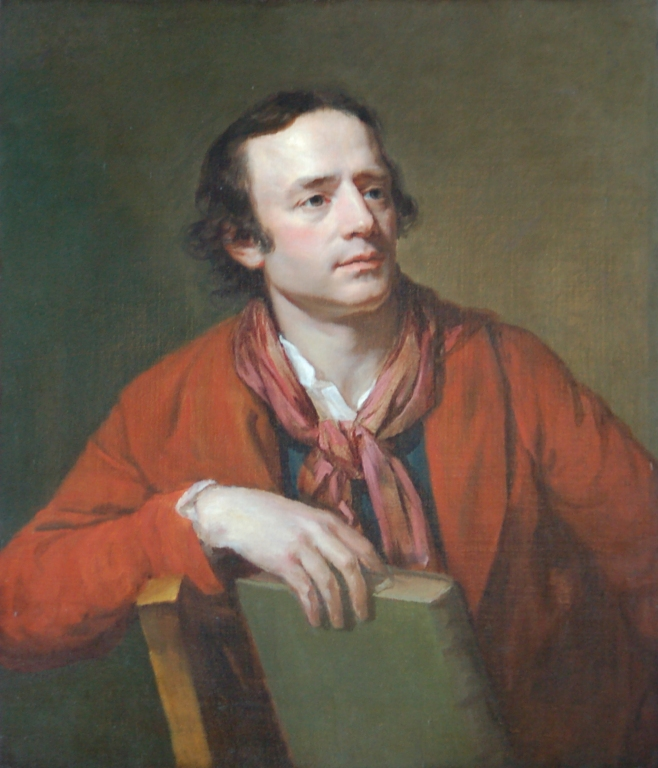
Col. Isaac Barré, MP

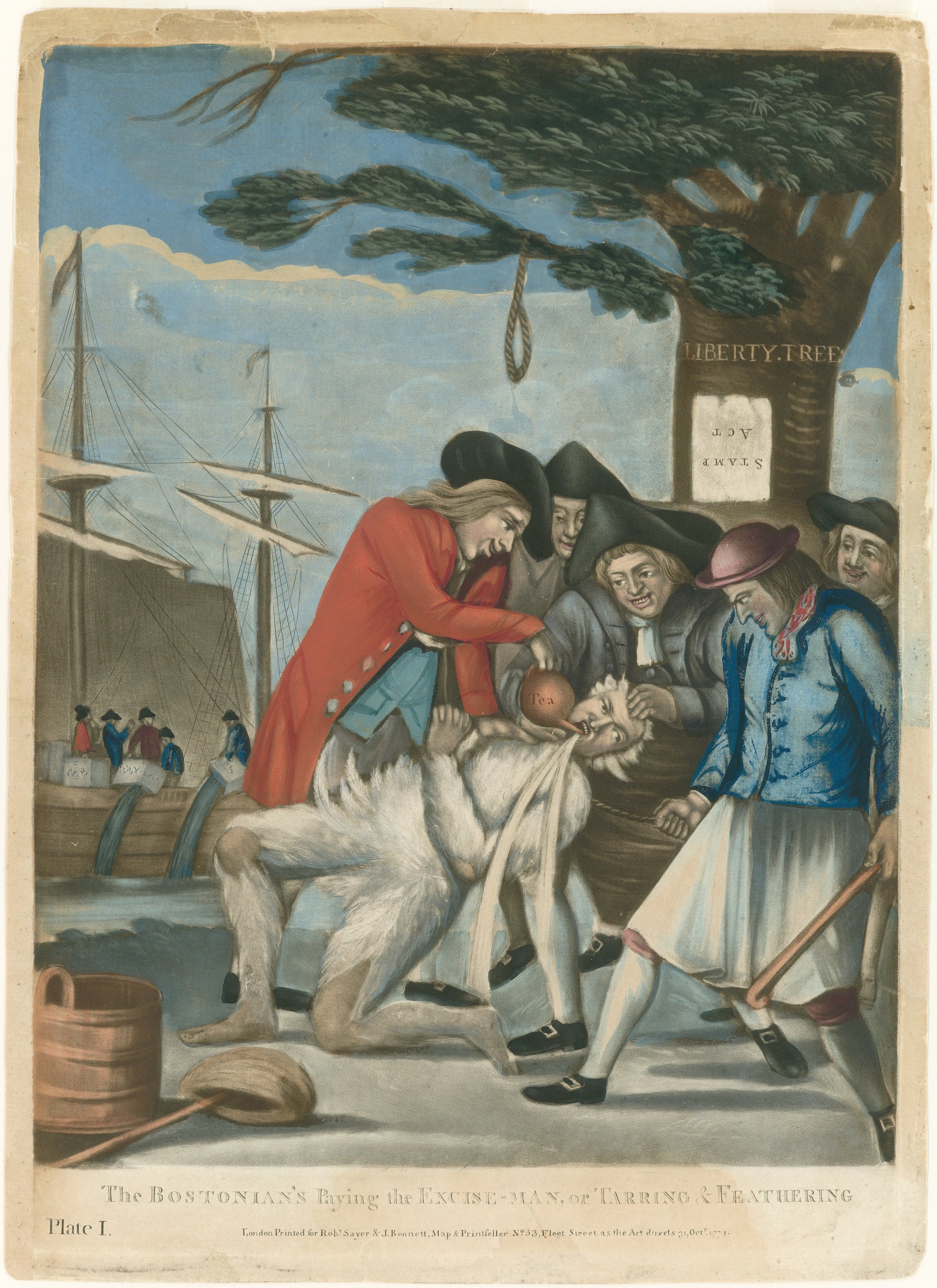
Anti-Stamp Act propaganda

- Col. Isaac Barré Irish MP defends American colonists in a fiery speech in Parliament during the debate on the Stamp Act.
- Stamp Act enacted by Parliament (March 22) to impose control and help defray the cost of keeping troops in America to control the colonists, imposing a tax on many types of printed materials used in the colonies. In Parliament, William Pitt and Earl Camden oppose it. Seen as a violation of rights, the Act sparks violent demonstrations in several Colonies. In May, Virginia's House of Burgesses Patrick Henry sponsors the Virginia Resolves claiming that, under British law, Virginians could be taxed only by an assembly to which they had elected representatives
- Quartering Act (March 24), act of Parliament requiring the Colonies to provide housing, food, and other provisions to British troops. The act is resisted or circumvented in most of the colonies. In 1767 and again in 1769, Parliament suspended the governor and legislature of New York for failure to comply

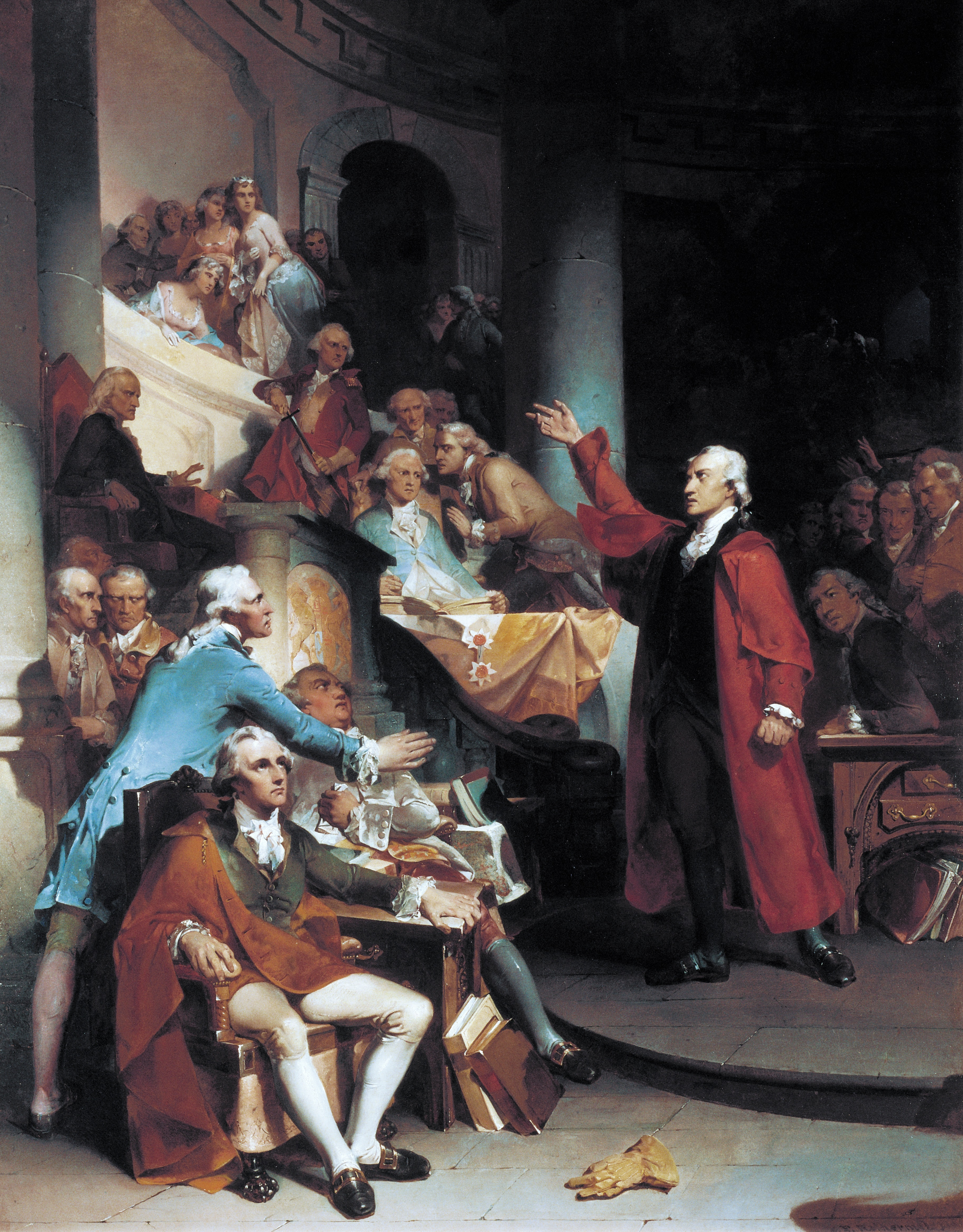
Patrick Henry

- Virginia Resolves (May 29) passed by the House of Burgesses, mainly authored by Patrick Henry, defends colonial rights against Parliament's action; widely disseminated in the colonies.
- Sons of Liberty created in Boston, name taken from a speech by Isaac Barré, MP; with Samuel Adams prominent
- Stamp Act Congress, gathering of delegates from 9 colonies which ratifies John Dickinson's Declaration of Rights and Grievances and petitions Parliament and the king to repeal the Act (Oct. 19)
- Rockingham becomes Prime Minister (July 17, 1765-July 1766)

== 1766 ==
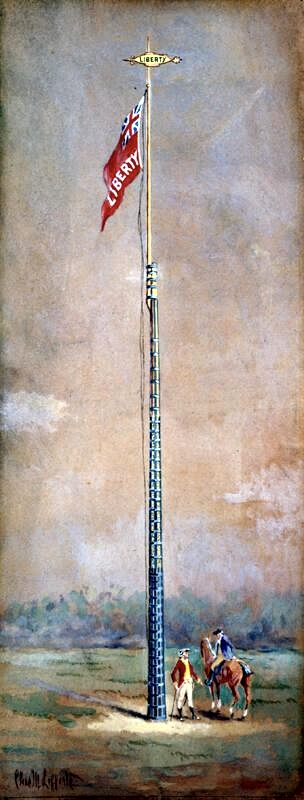
Liberty pole, New York City

- William Pitt, 1st Earl of Chatham becomes Prime Minister (July 31), serving until 1768.
- Stamp Act repealed by Parliament; Declaratory Act simultaneously issued asserting Parliament's "full power and authority to make laws and statutes ... to bind the colonies and people of America ... in all cases whatsoever"; designed to overrule actions by the legislative assemblies of each colony, which had traditionally held authority (March 18)
- Liberty pole erected in New York City commons in celebration of the Stamp Act repeal (May 21). An intermittent skirmish with the British garrison over the removal of this and other poles, and their replacement by the Sons of Liberty, rages until the Province of New York is under the control of the revolutionary New York Provincial Congress in 1775

== 1767 ==
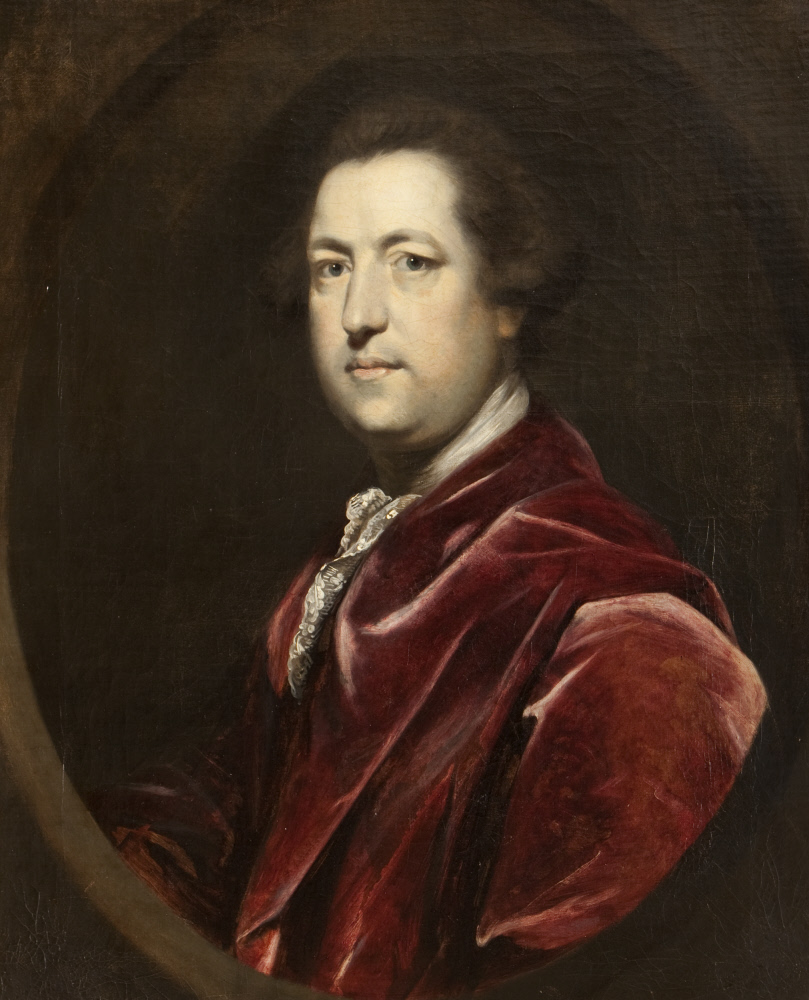
Charles Townshend

- Townshend Acts – renewed Parliament assertion of its right to tax the American colonies after the repeal of the Stamp Act, placing duties on many items imported into America, including tea (June 29). The American colonists, who were denied any representation in Parliament, strongly condemned the Acts as an egregious abuse of power.
  - The Revenue Act 1767 (29 June 1767) placed taxes on glass, lead, "painters' colors" (paint), paper, and tea. It also gave the supreme court of each colony the power to issue writs of assistance,general warrants that could be issued to customs officers and used to search private property for smuggled goods.
  - The Commissioners of Customs Act 1767 created a new Customs Board for the North American colonies, to be headquartered in Boston with five customs commissioners to enforce shipping regulations and increase tax revenue for the Crown. Previously, customs enforcement was handled by the Customs Board in London. Due to the distance, enforcement was poor, taxes were avoided and smuggling was rampant. (29 June 1767).
  - The Indemnity Act 1767 (passed on 2 July 1767).
  - The New York Restraining Act 1767 forbade the New York Assembly and the governor of New York from passing any new bills until they complied with the Quartering Act 1765, which required New York to provide housing, food and supplies for the British troops now stationed permanently, despite the end of the French and Indian War. The New York Assembly resisted the Quartering Act on the grounds it did not limit the number of troops to be quartered and that Parliament could not constitutionally tax the colony without its consent. (Passed 2 July 1767).
  - The Vice Admiralty Court Act 1768 passed on 8 March 1768.

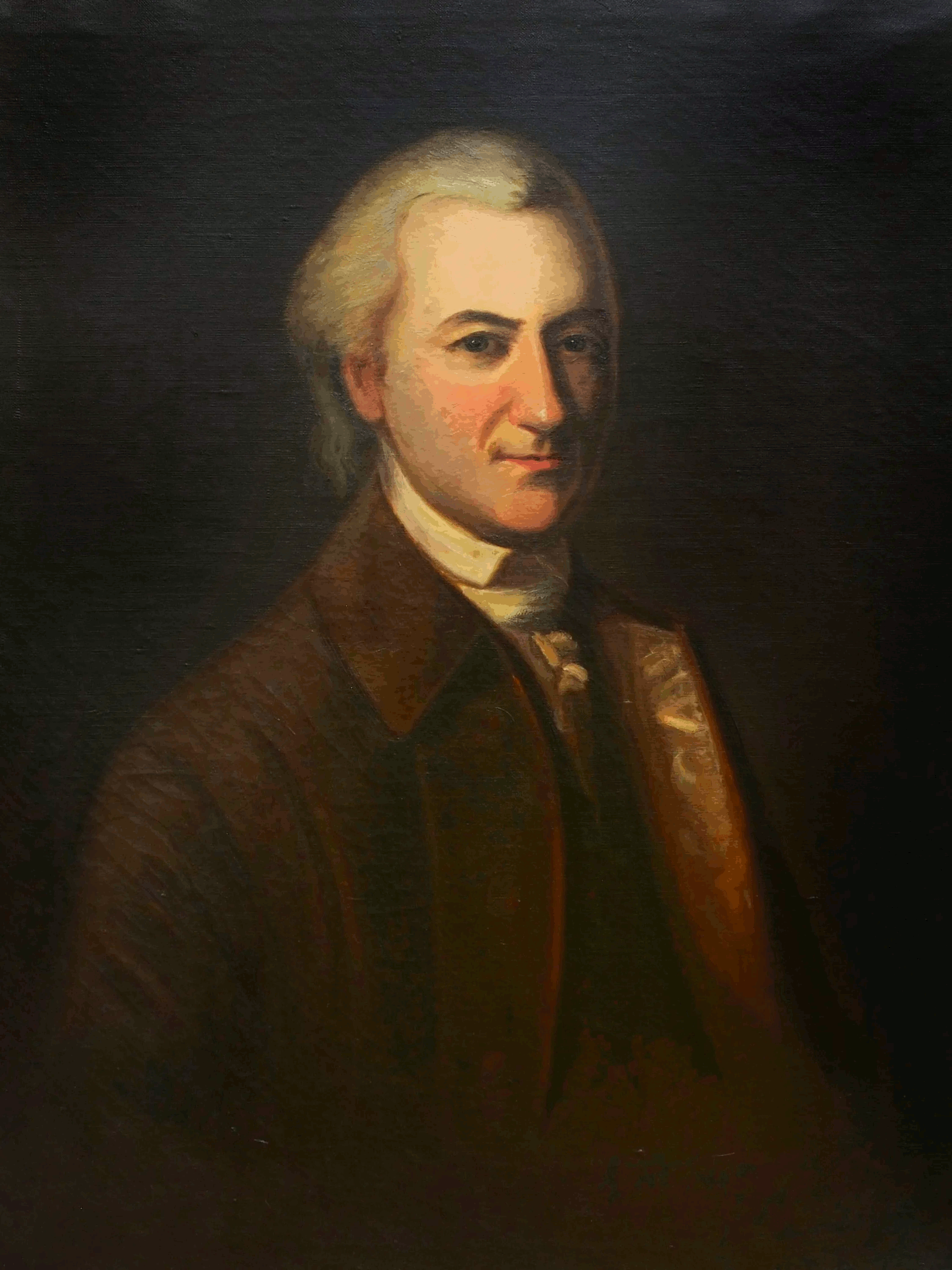
John Dickinson

- Letters from a Farmer in Pennsylvania by John Dickinson are twelve letters widely read and reprinted throughout the Thirteen Colonies, and were important in uniting the colonists against the Townshend Acts.

== 1768 ==
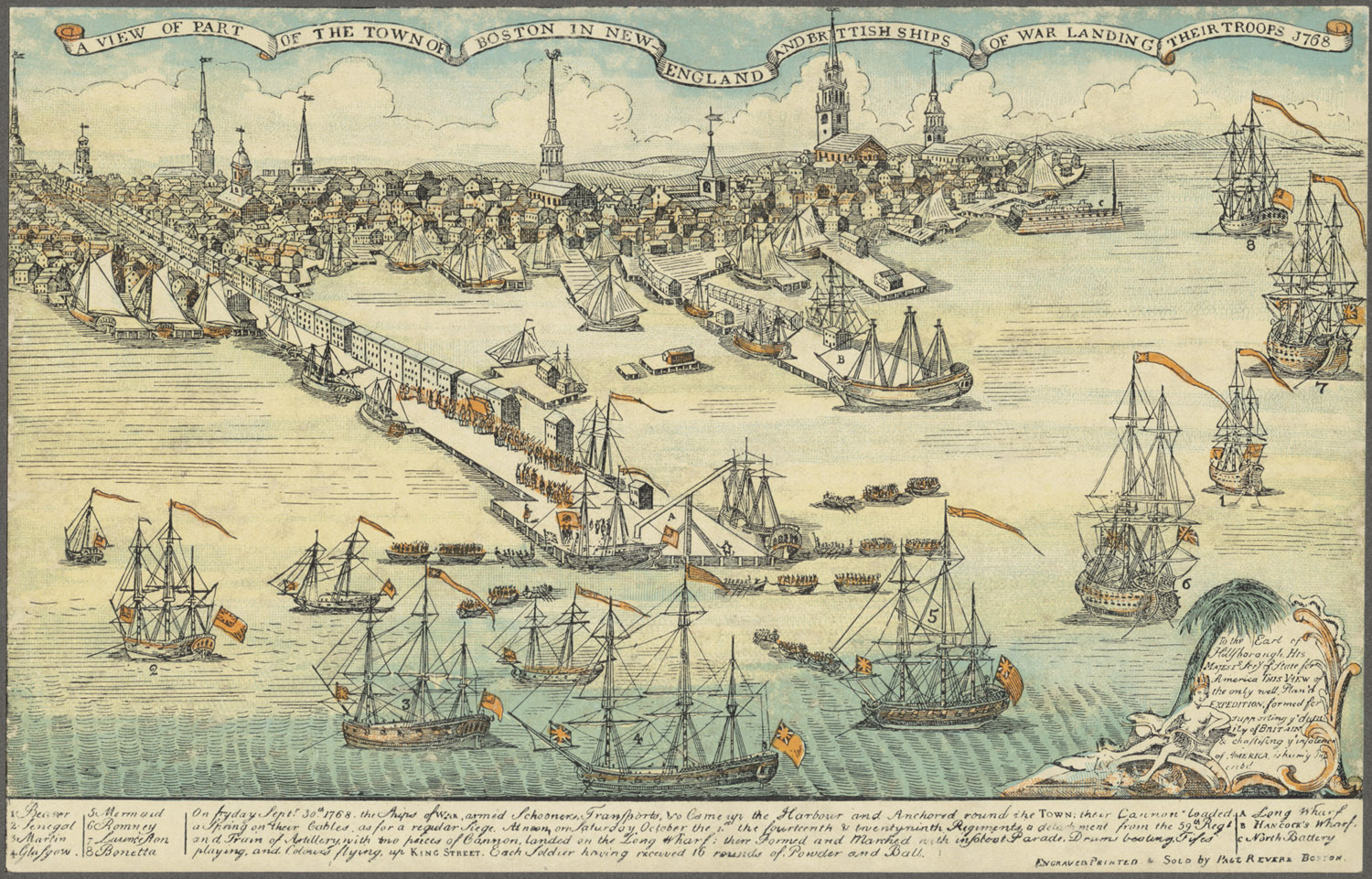
Boston Harbor 1768, engraving by Paul Revere showing British warships

- Secretary of State for the Colonies established by the government to deal with the increasingly difficult issues ruling North America; Hillsborough first office holder (27 February)
- Massachusetts Circular Letter (February) by Samuel Adams asserts the Townshend Acts are unconstitutional. British Secretary of State for the Colonies orders colonial governors to stop their own assemblies from endorsing the letter; he also orders the governor of Massachusetts to dissolve the General Court if the colonial assembly does not revoke the letter. By month's end, the assemblies of New Hampshire, Connecticut and New Jersey have endorsed the letter.

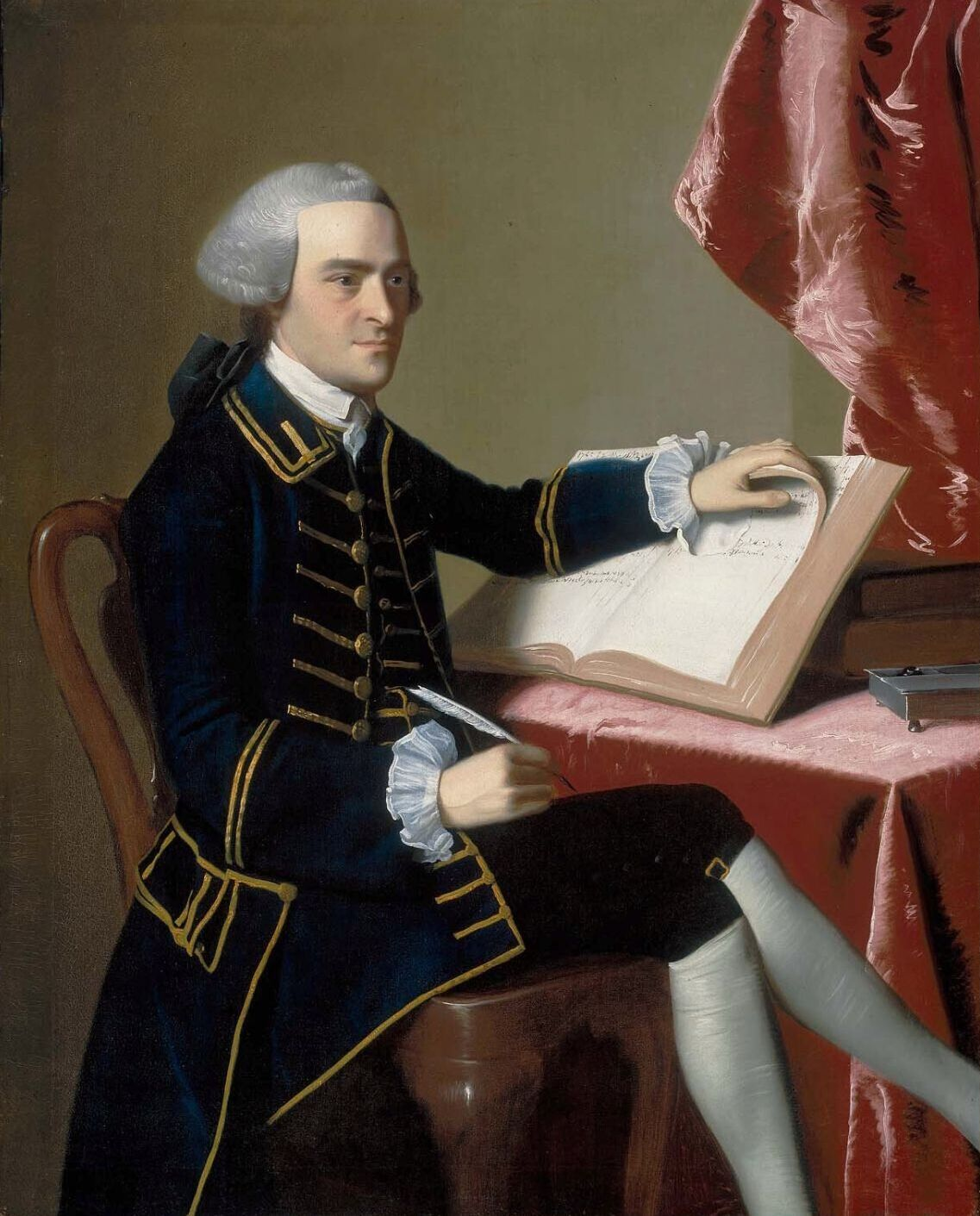
John Hancock, owner of the Liberty

- Liberty Riot (June 10) Mob violence in Boston attacking customs officials seizing the ship Liberty of John Hancock for smuggling. British send a warship armed with 50 cannons to occupy Boston harbor to impose order.

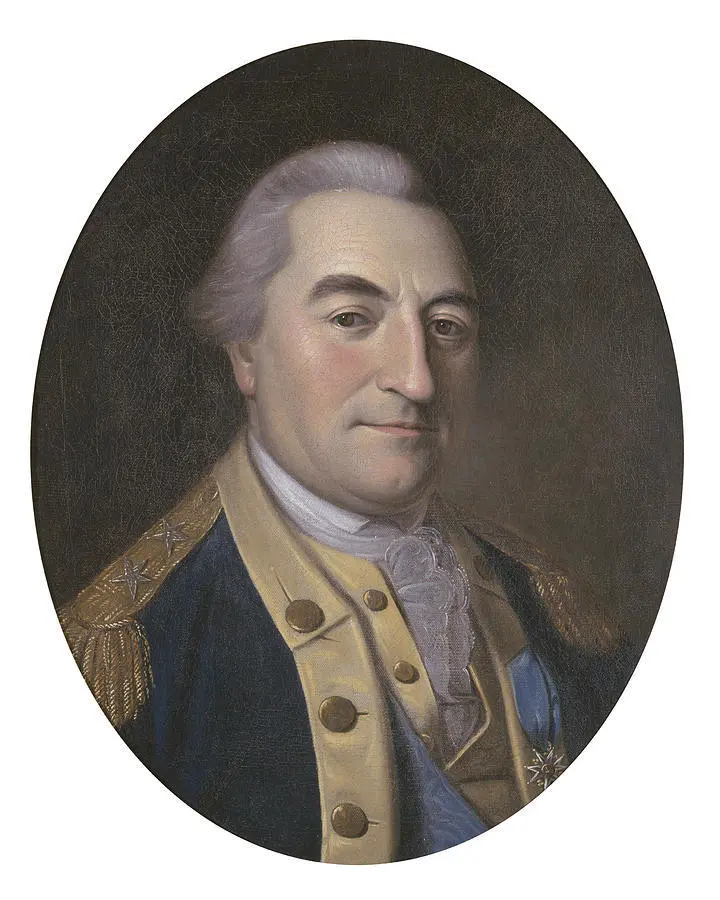
Johann de Kalb

- Royal governor of Massachusetts dissolves the assembly (July) after the legislature defies his order to revoke Samuel Adams's circular letter. In August, in Boston and New York, merchants agree to boycott most British goods until the Townshend Acts are repealed. In September, at a town meeting in Boston, residents are urged to arm themselves. Later in September, more British warships sail into Boston Harbor; two regiments of British regular infantry land in Boston and set up permanent military occupation.
- France sends military officer Johann de Kalb on a covert mission to assess American resistance to the British; he later becomes a general in the Continental Army, dies in combat

== 1769 ==
- To the Betrayed Inhabitants of the City and Colony of New York broadside published anonymously by local Son of Liberty Alexander McDougall (December 16)
- Hancock's confiscated ship was refitted in Rhode Island to serve as a Royal Navy ship, renamed HMS Liberty, and then used to patrol off Rhode Island for customs violations. On 19 July 1769, the crew of Liberty under Captain William Reid accosted Joseph Packwood, a New London captain, and seized and towed two Connecticut ships into Newport. In retribution, Packwood and a mob of Rhode Islanders confronted Reid, then boarded, scuttled, and later burned the ship on the north end of Goat Island in Newport harbor as one of the first overt American acts of defiance against the British Crown.

== 1770 ==
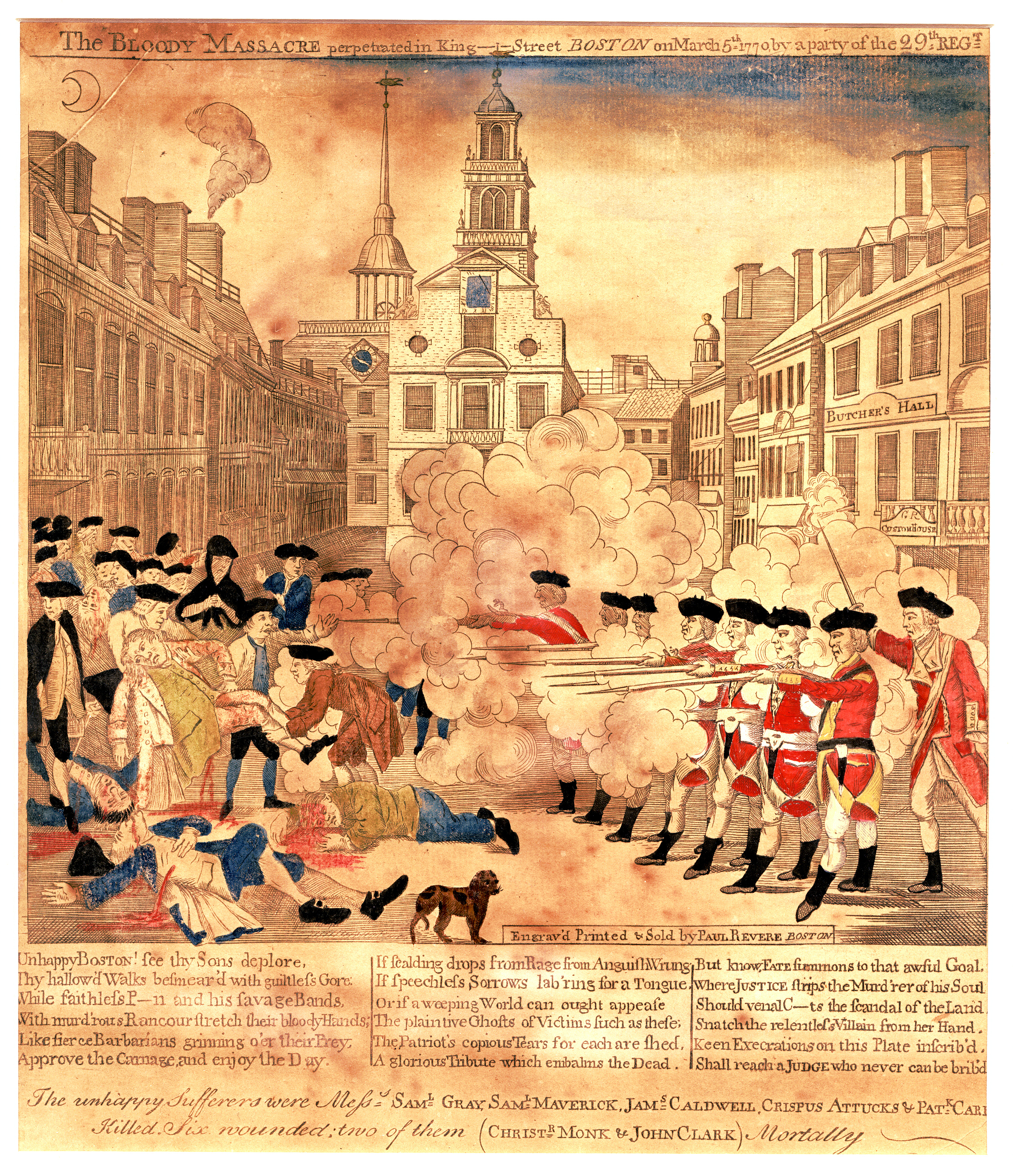
The Boston Massacre, an engraving by Patriot Paul Revere. The image frames the incident as British soldiers deliberately firing on a crowd.

- Golden Hill incident in New York involving the Sons of Liberty; British troops wound civilians, including one death (January 19)
- Lord North becomes Prime Minister of Great Britain (January 28), serving until 1782, essentially the entire span of the war
- Shooting of Christopher Seider (February 22)
- Boston Massacre (March 5), a small number of British soldiers, harass an unruly crowd of 300–400 and pelted with snowballs and oyster shells, fired upon the civilians, killing 5. The soldiers were arrested and tried. Patriot John Adams defended them in court.

== 1771 ==
- Battle of Alamance in North Carolina (May 16)

== 1772 ==
- Letters of Junius, a collection of anonymous political pieces written between 1769 and 1772, is published in London. One letter warns the king, "Remember that a throne acquired by one revolution may be lost by another."

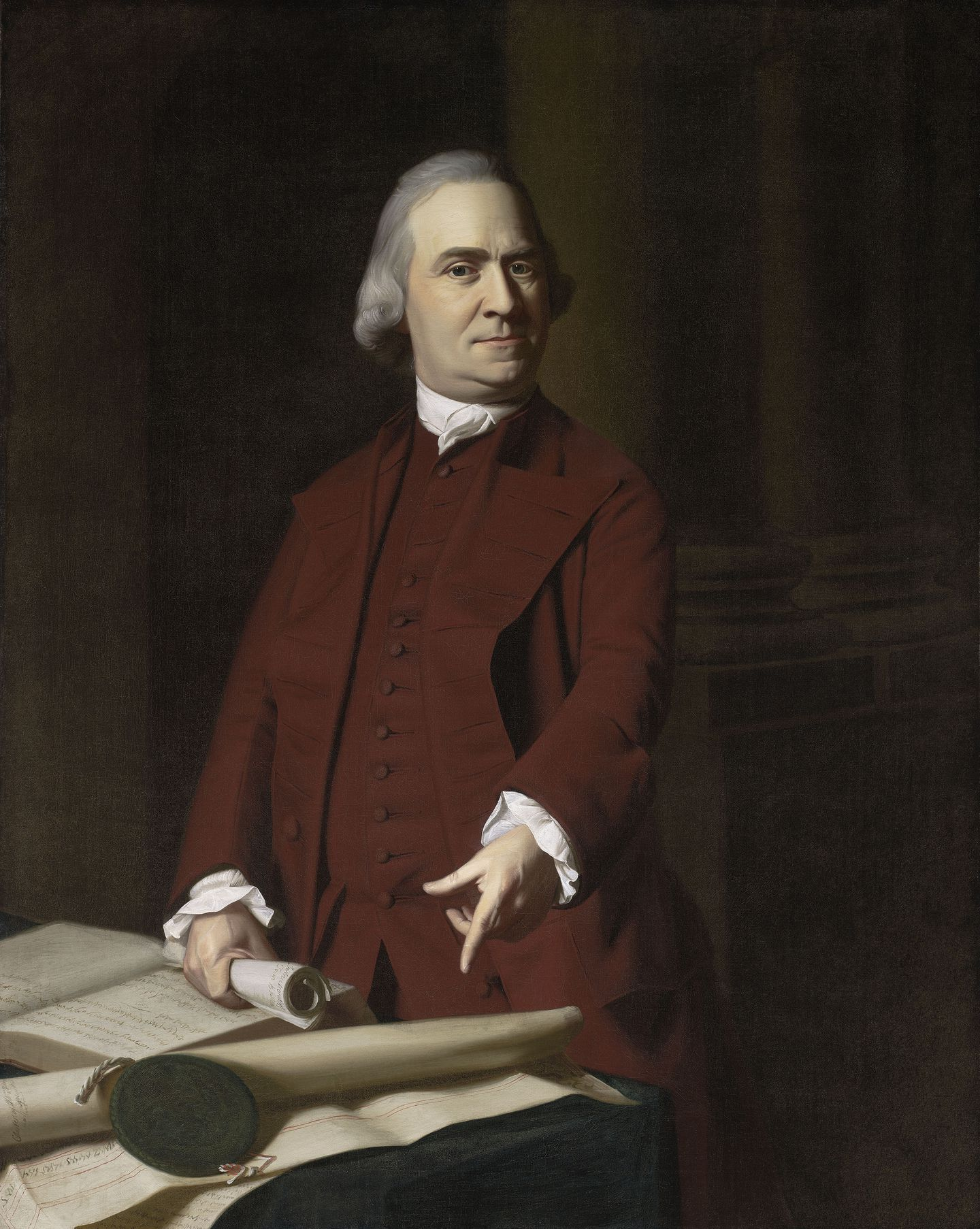
Samuel Adams

- Samuel Adams organizes the Committees of Correspondence
- Pine Tree Riot (April 13–14), New Hampshire colonists' resistance to royal regulations on the cutting of pine trees
- The Watauga Association in what would become Tennessee declares itself independent (May)
- Gaspee Affair (June 9)

== 1773 ==
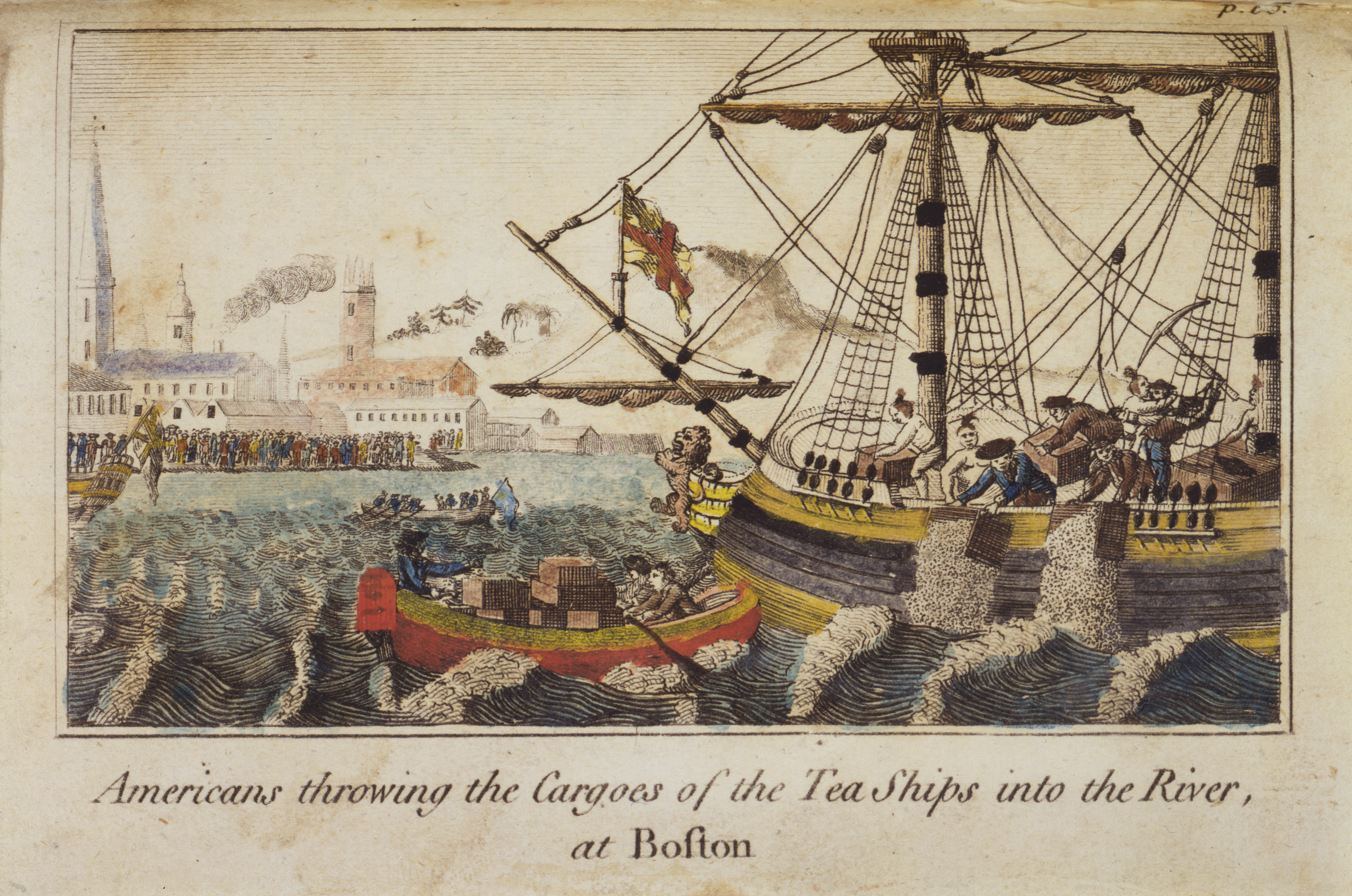
Boston Tea Party

- Sheffield Declaration of individual rights passed in the town of Sheffield, Massachusetts. The first resolution reads that "Mankind in a state of nature are equal, free, and independent of each other, and have a right to the undisturbed enjoyment of their lives, their liberty and property". (Jan. 12)
- James Rivington's New-York Gazetteer begins publication (April 22)
- Tea Act passed by Parliament, requiring the colonies to buy tea solely from the East India Company rather than a variety of sources now deemed illegal (May 10)
- Virginians and Bostonians call on Americans to form inter-colonial committees of correspondence; mass meeting in Philadelphia condemns the Tea Act (Oct 16)
- Association of the Sons of Liberty in New York published by local Sons of Liberty (December 15)
- Colonists in all major ports refuse to allow tea to be landed
- Boston Tea Party (December 16) White Bostonians dressed as Native Americans board three British ships anchored in the harbor and dump 90,000 pounds of East India Company tea in chests.

== 1774 ==
- Benjamin Franklin, Massachusetts' agent in London, is ridiculed before Parliament (January 29)
- Lord Dunmore's War (May–October)

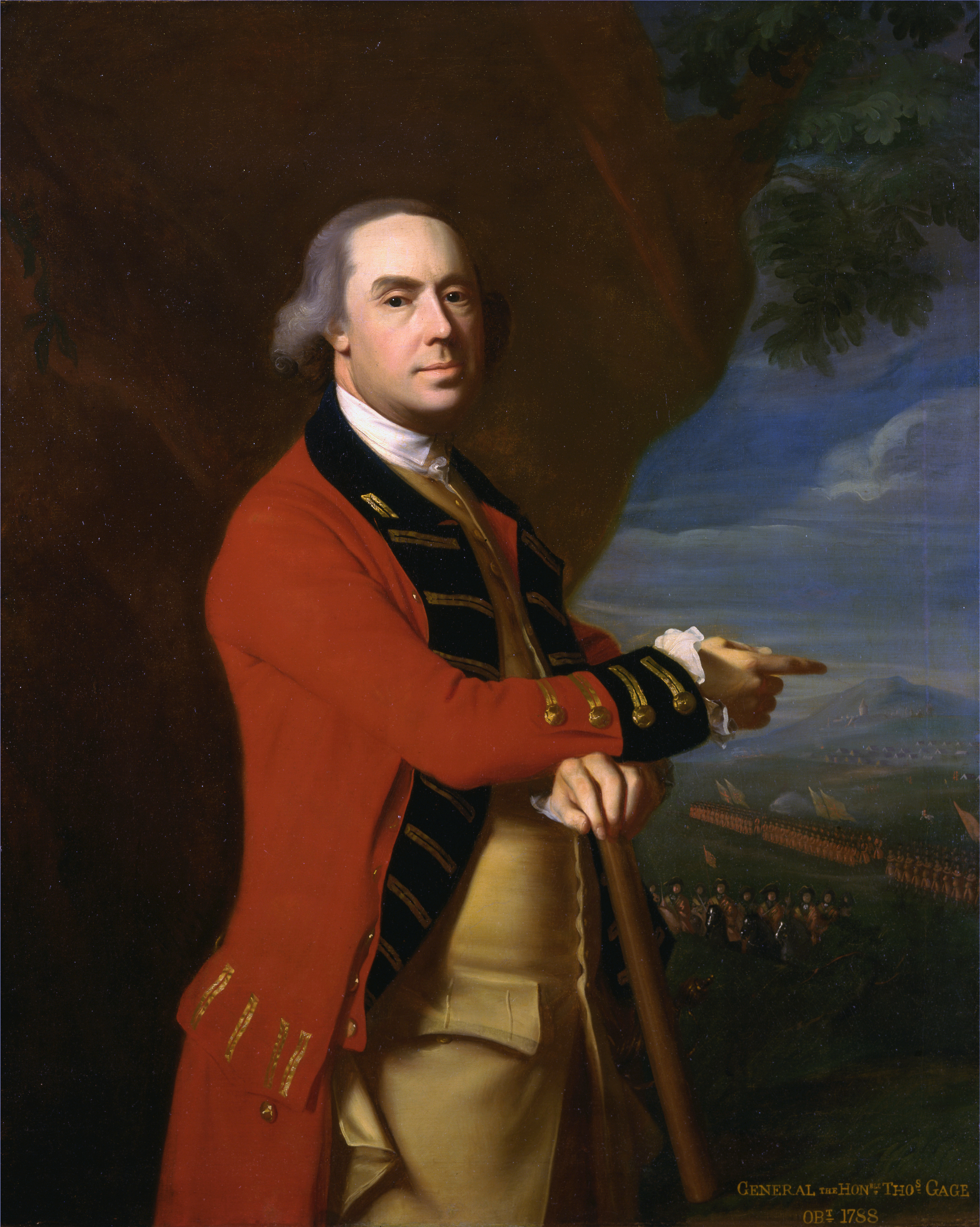
Thomas Gage

- General Thomas Gage appointed military governor of Massachusetts (May 13), replacing civilian governor Thomas Hutchinson
- British Parliament passes a series of bills, called in the colonies the Intolerable Acts, to punish Boston for the Boston Tea Party including:

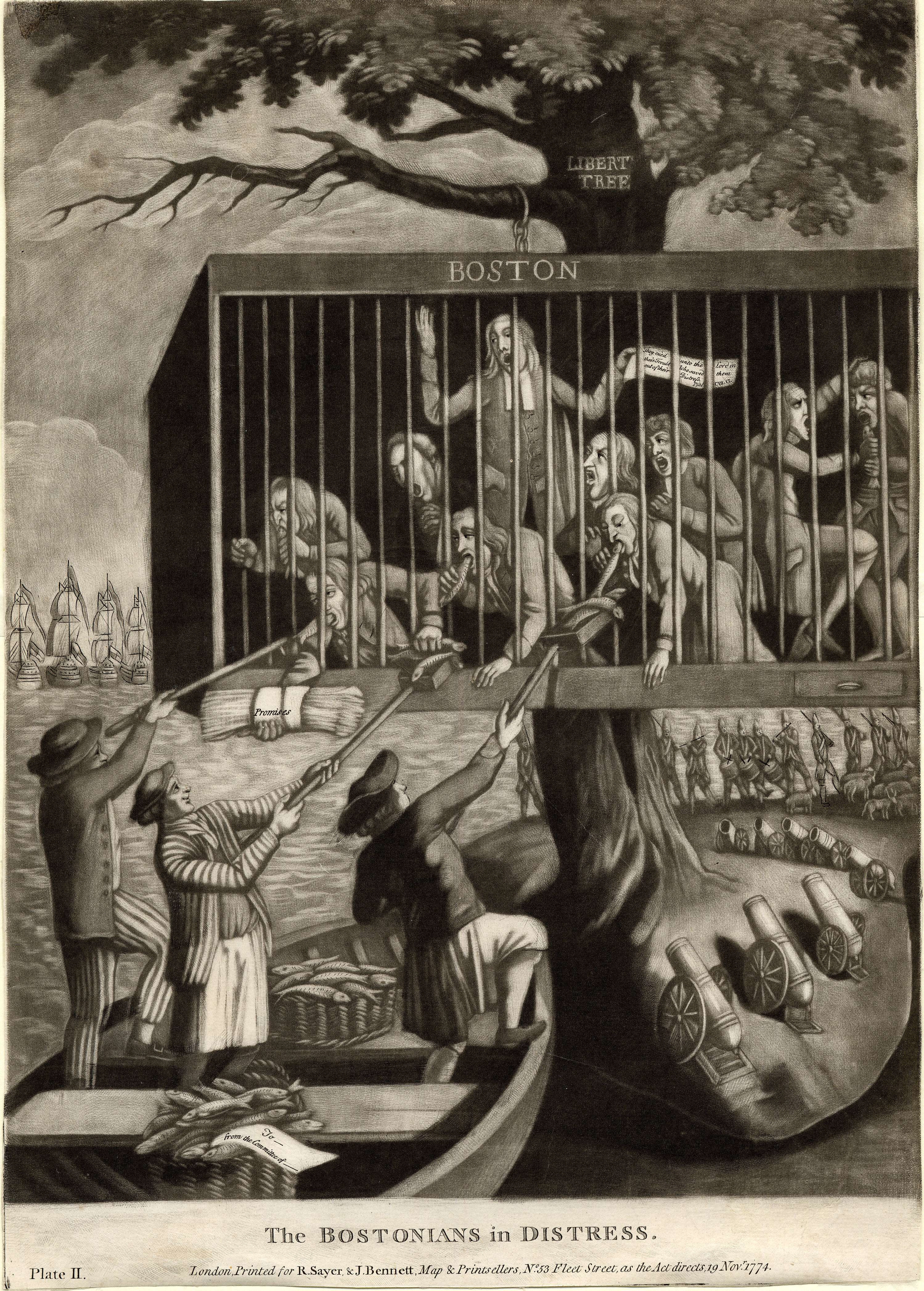
"Bostonians in Distress" after the closing of the port

  - Boston Port Act (March 31) – closing the port
  - Administration of Justice Act provides for the trials of colonists in other colonies or England, away from sympathetic juries; undermines long tradition of trials with juries of their peers (May 20)
  - Massachusetts Government Act empowers the king to appoint council members and restricts town meetings to once per year and to discuss only local matters, attempting to suppress the long tradition of self-government (May 20)
  - A second Quartering Act allows the billeting of troops in unoccupied buildings (June 2)
  - Quebec Act (June 22) set the terms for the governance of territory won from France in the French and Indian War; continuation of French civil law and governmental, and toleration of Catholicism; the territorial boundaries extended through the Ohio Valley, which the colonies of Virginia, Pennsylvania, and Connecticut colonies claimed by their charters and expected to profit from by land sales to white settlers, ignoring the claims of Native Americans.
- Thomas Gage replaces Thomas Hutchinson as governor of Massachusetts (May 13)
- Rhode Island issues first call for a "grand congress" (May 17)
- Massachusetts calls for a "Continental Congress"
- Isaac Barré MP reminds Parliament of the huge importance of American commerce to Britain, which the punitive legislation disrupts

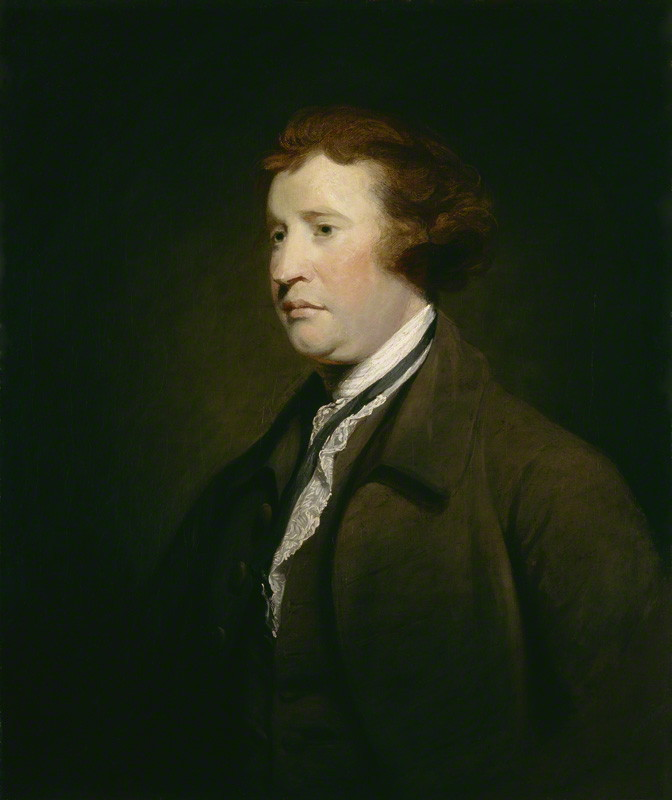
Edmund Burke

- Anglo-Irish MP Edmund Burke delivers the speech On American Taxation in Parliament, calling for a repeal of the Townshend acts, warning that the draconian and punitive policies against the Americans were wrong and would be counterproductive. He had the speech printed and it was widely distributed.

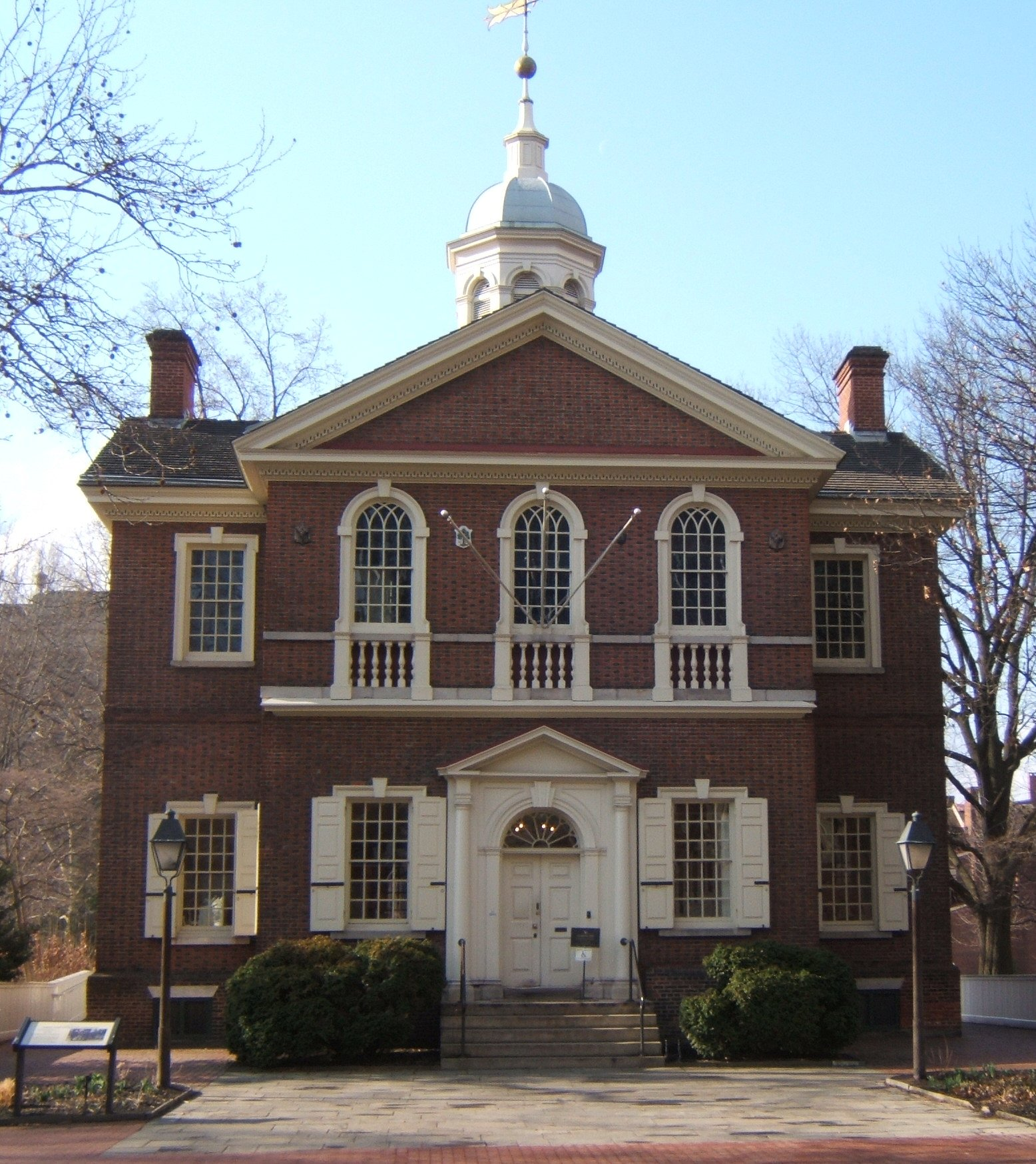
Carpenters' Hall where the First Continental Congress met

- Powder Alarm, General Gage's secret raid on the Cambridge powder magazine (September 1)
- First Continental Congress, (September 5 – October 26); 12 colonies send delegates; major actions:
  - Joseph Galloway's Plan of Union debated September 1774, calling for the creation of a Grand Council for the American colonies, with each having representation and hold and exercise power within the British Empire; rejected by the Continental Congress.
  - Declaration and Resolves of the First Continental Congress, also known as Declaration of Rights (October 14)
  - Continental Association created (October 20, effective December 1), the agreement exhibited the collective will of the colonies to act together for their common interests, initially an economic boycott against British goods. The agreement is published in a London newspaper. The British government begins to realize the extent of the colonies' collective resistance.
  - Petition to the King (October 26) to repeal the Intolerable Acts; addressed to George III, but since 1688 the monarch could not act independently of Parliament, which had passed the acts
- Suffolk Resolves, Suffolk County, Massachusetts The declaration rejected the Massachusetts Government Act and resulted in a boycott of imported goods from Britain unless the Intolerable Acts were repealed. The Resolves were recognized by British statesman Edmund Burke as a major development in colonial animosity and he urged British conciliation with the American colonies, to little effect.(September 9)
- Burning of the Peggy Stewart (October 19) in Annapolis, Maryland for contravening calls to boycott British tea landings, "the Annapolis teaparty"
- "A Summary View of the Rights of British America," written anonymously by Thomas Jefferson, published in London, asserting that kings were servants, not proprietors of people (November)
- Capture of Fort William and Mary (December 14) One of the first overt acts of armed conflict in what became the American Revolutionary War and the only battle to take place in New Hampshire.
- Greenwich Tea Party (December 22)

== 1775 ==
- William Pitt introduces a bill of conciliation with the colonies in Parliament, recognizing Congress as an institution, renounced the use of force against American liberties, abandoned claims to taxing power, affirmed colonial charters (January 20)
- Dr. Samuel Johnson publishes Taxation no Tyranny in response to the Declaration and Resolves of the First Continental Congress
- Merchants of Bristol and London complain to Parliament about the declining trade to America and the threats to manufacturing in Britain. (January)
- Salem Gunpowder Raid (February 26)
- Conciliatory Resolution (February 27) in Parliament, allowing any colony that agreed to contribute to the public defense, as well as to support civil government and the administration of justice, as approved by the Crown and the two Houses of Parliament, to be exempt from taxation. Taxes for the regulation of commerce would continue to be levied, but their net produce would be returned to the colony. The resolution arrived in the American colonies after war had broken out in Massachusetts, and was rejected by the Continental Congress.

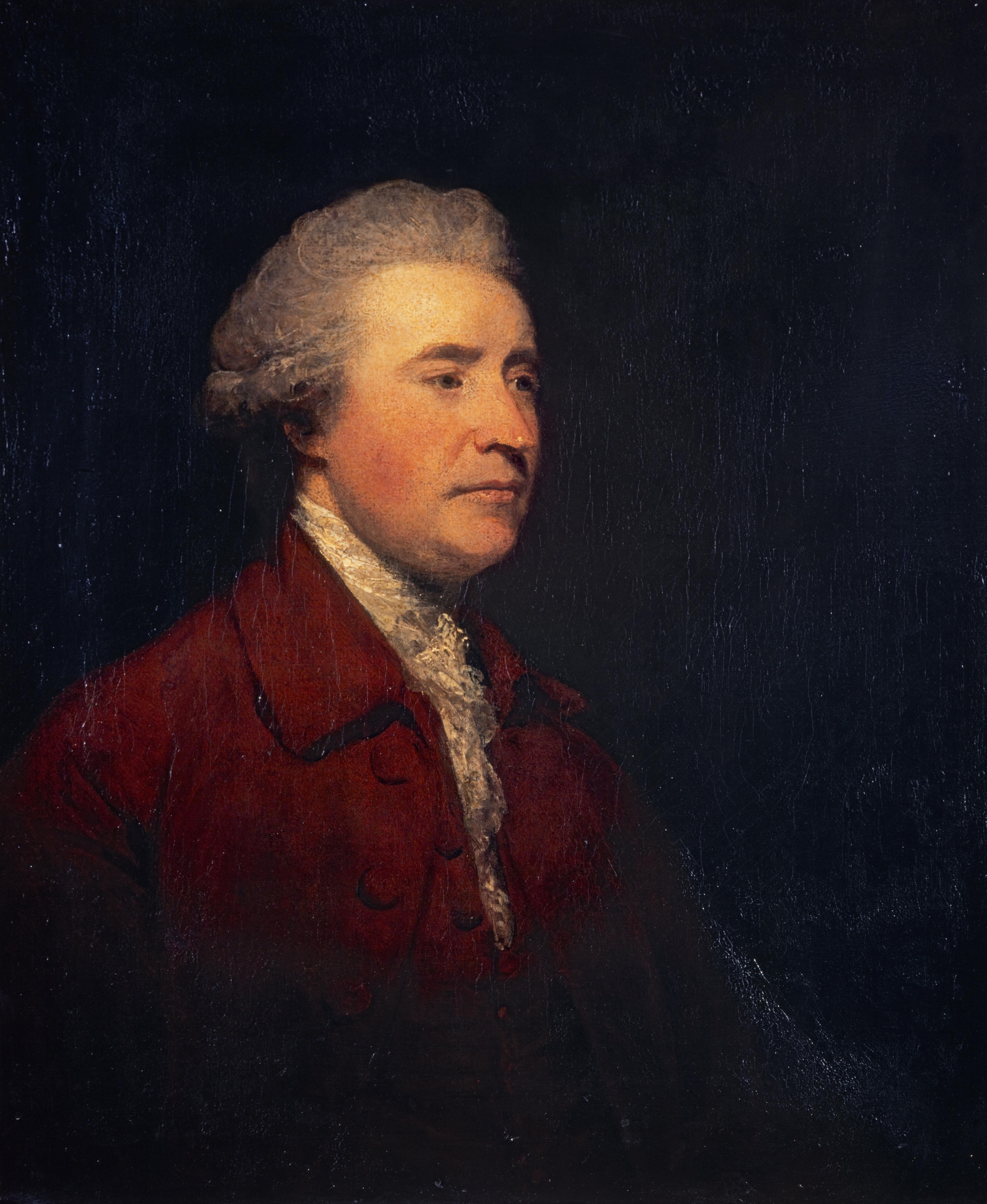
Edmund Burke

- Edmund Burke delivers a major speech to Parliament "On Conciliation with America", appealing for peace as preferable to civil war and reminding the House of Commons of America's growing population, its industry and its wealth. He warned against the notion that the Americans would back down in the face of force since most Americans were of British descent. (March 22, published in May)
- Restraining Acts 1775 (March 30) designed to divide the colonies, restricted New England colonies from trading with any but Britain and Ireland; restricted New Englanders' access to fishing
- Paul Revere's Midnight Ride (April 18)

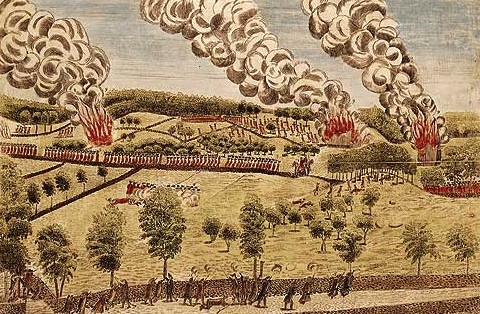
Battle of Lexington

- Battles of Lexington and Concord, (April 19) skirmishes between British regular troops and Massachusetts citizen militias, outbreak of armed conflict of the American Revolutionary War
- Siege of Boston (19 April 1775 – 17 March 1776), American blockade of British forces in the port of Boston, garnering other colonies' support, ending with British withdrawal.
- Gunpowder Incident, Virginia (April 21)
- New York Armory Raid (April 23)
- Skenesboro, New York (now Whitehall, New York) captured by Lieutenant Samuel Herrick (May 9)

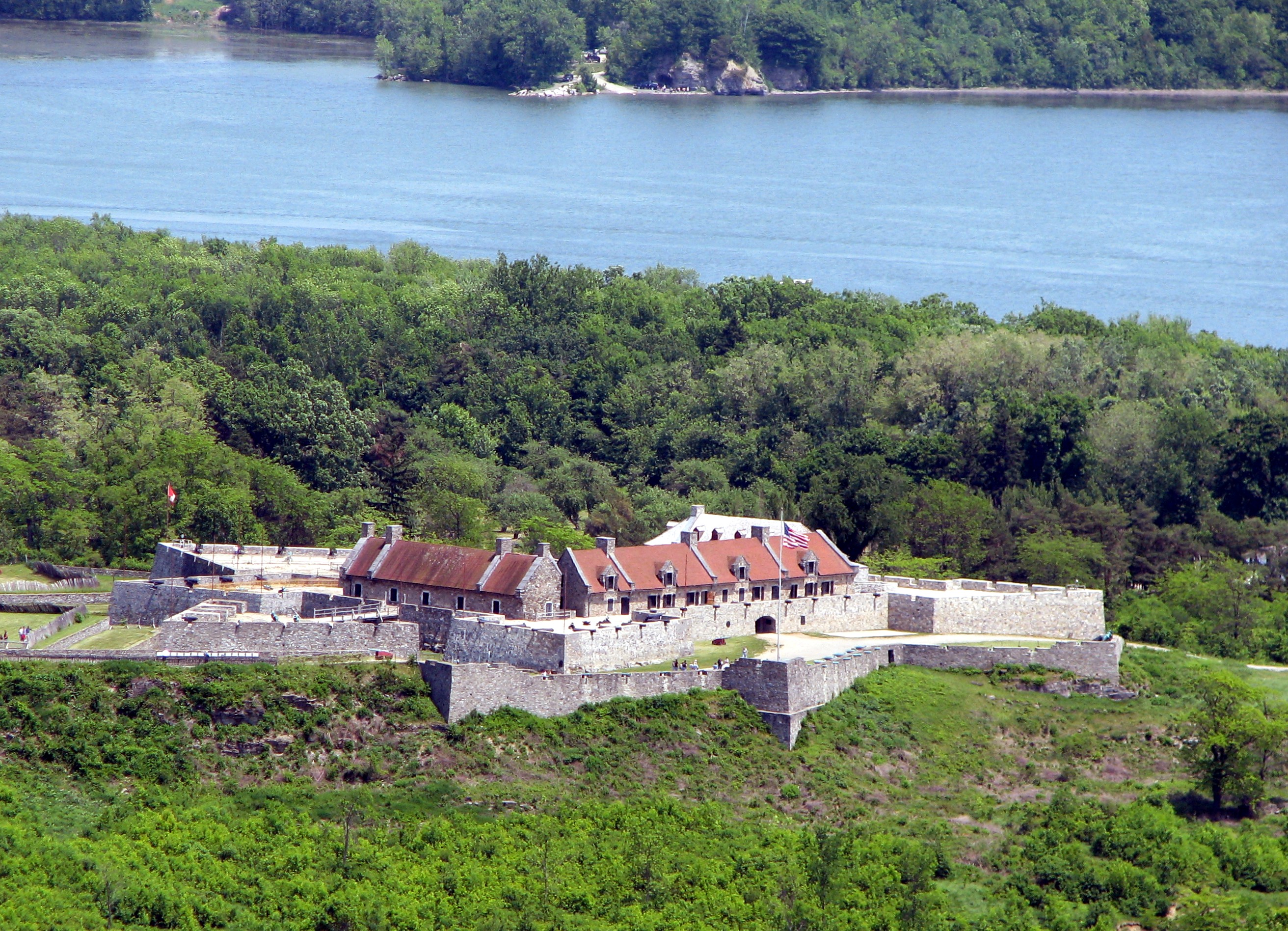
Fort Ticonderoga, NY

- Fort Ticonderoga captured in upstate New York by Ethan Allen, Benedict Arnold, and the Green Mountain Boys (May 10), American victory, major boost psychologically, but importantly the cannons they capture there are moved to Boston and are crucial to forcing the British to evacuate Boston and redeploy to New York City.

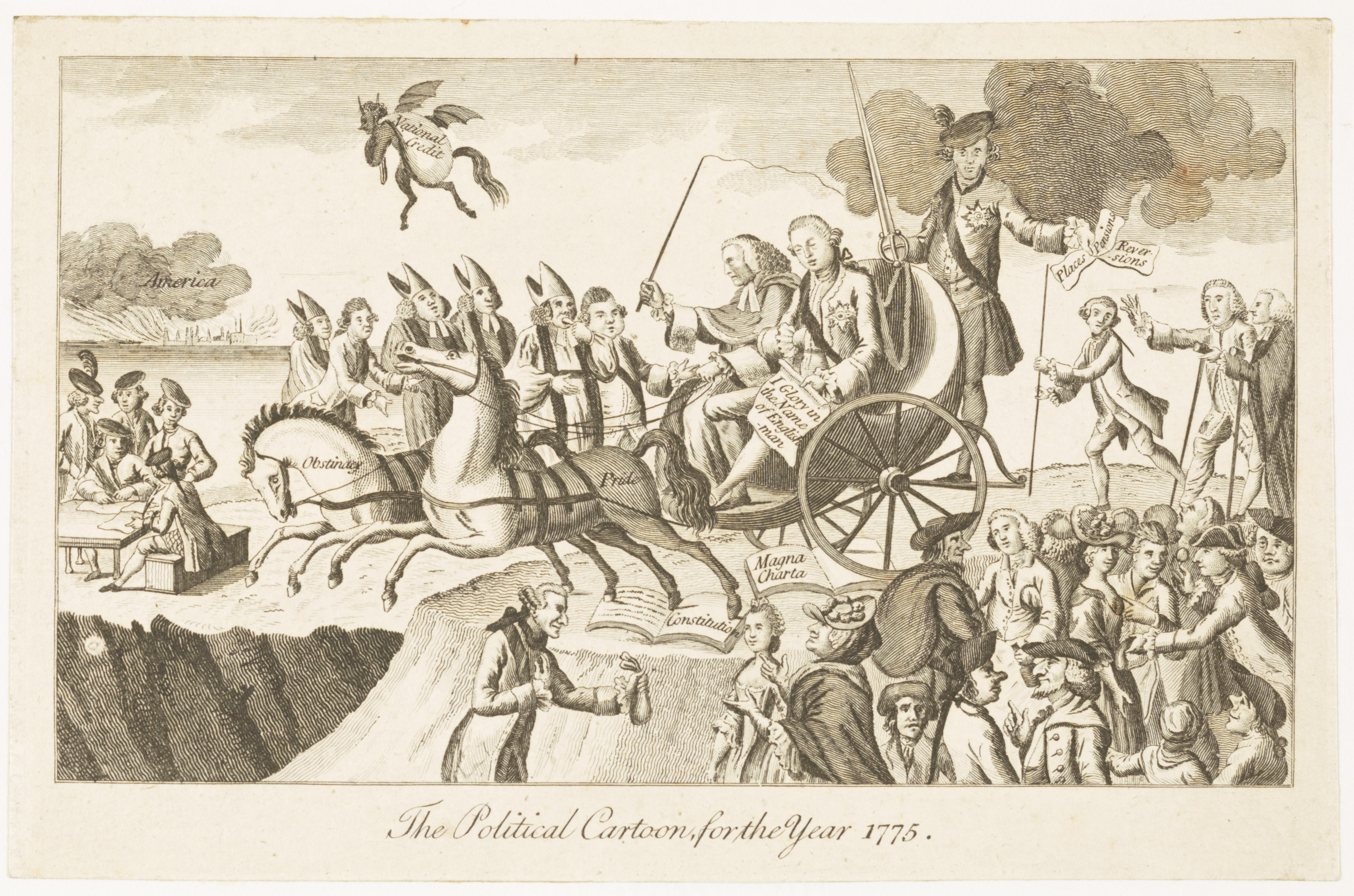
"Political cartoon for the year 1775" (Westminster Magazine, May 1775) King George and Lord Bute are driven in a carriage to a precipice by horses labeled "Pride" and "Obstinacy". The carriage tramples on Magna Carta and the Constitution. Lord Chatham tries to stop them; PM Lord North looks on in approval. In the distance America burns.

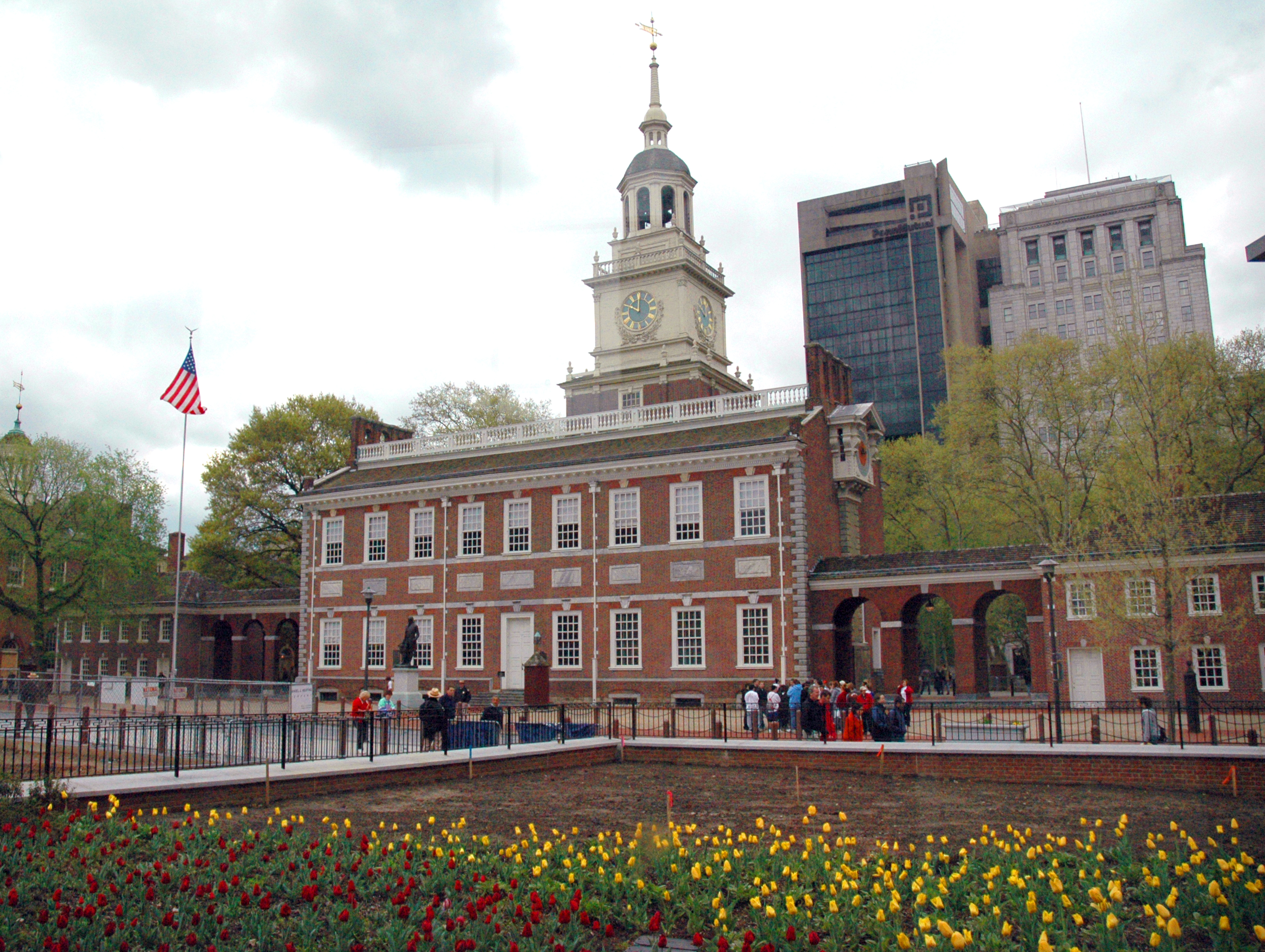
Independence Hall in Philadelphia, where the Second Continental Congress met

- Second Continental Congress begins meeting as scheduled (May 10) it functioned as the de facto federation government at the outset of the Revolutionary War by raising militias, directing strategy, appointing diplomats, and writing petitions such as the Declaration of the Causes and Necessity of Taking Up Arms and the Olive Branch Petition. All 13 colonies were represented when the Congress unanimously adopted the following year later the Declaration of Independence.
- British Major Generals Sir William Howe, John Burgoyne, and Sir Henry Clinton arrive in Boston (May 25)
- Battle of Chelsea Creek, Massachusetts (May 27–28). American victory, first capture of a British naval vessel by Colonial forces.
- Battle of Machias (June 11–12)
- Continental Army created by Congress with George Washington of Virginia as commanding general (June 14)

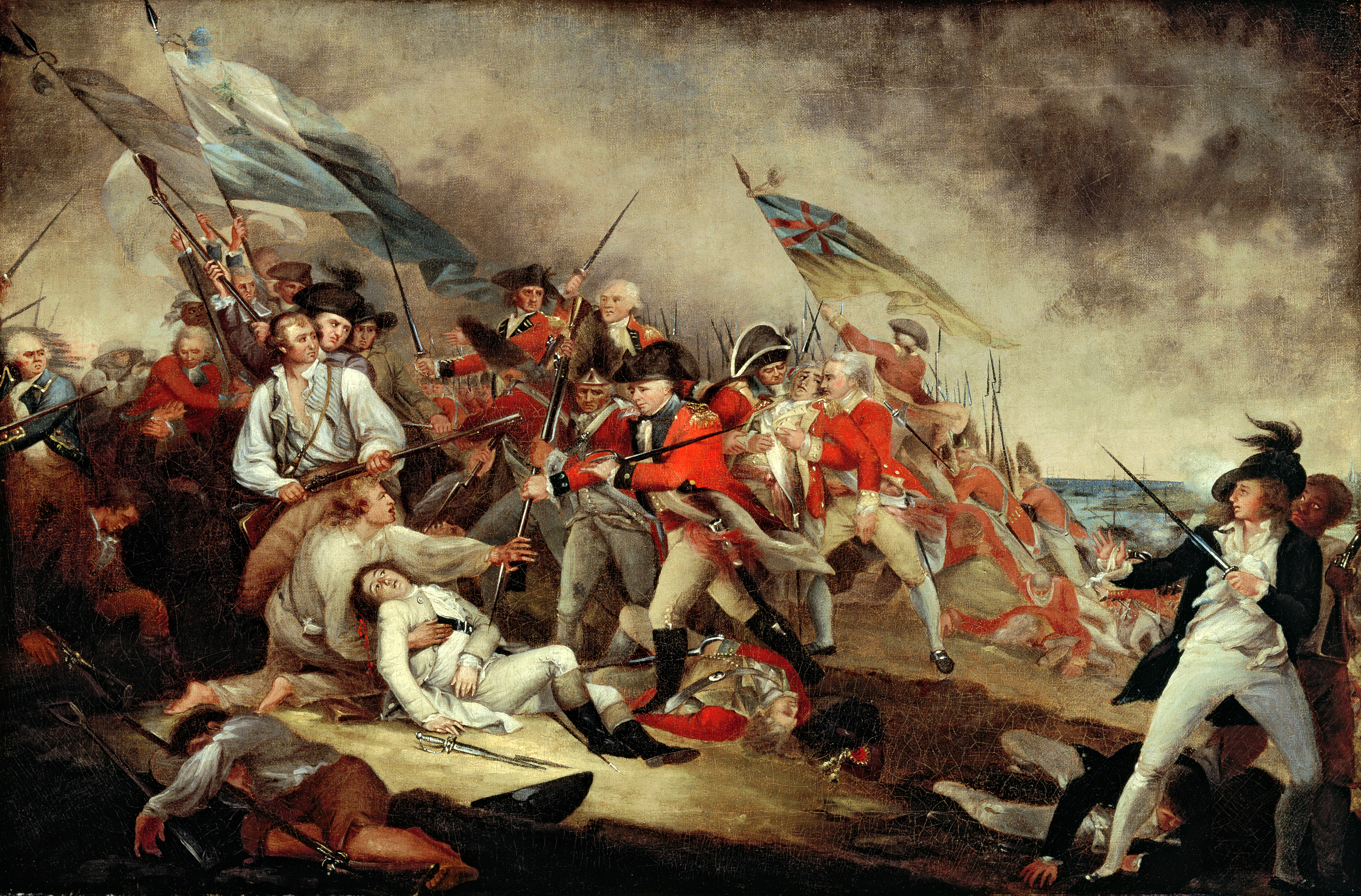
Battle of Bunker Hill, Boston

- Battle of Bunker Hill, Boston (June 17), pyrrhic British victory with large casualties.

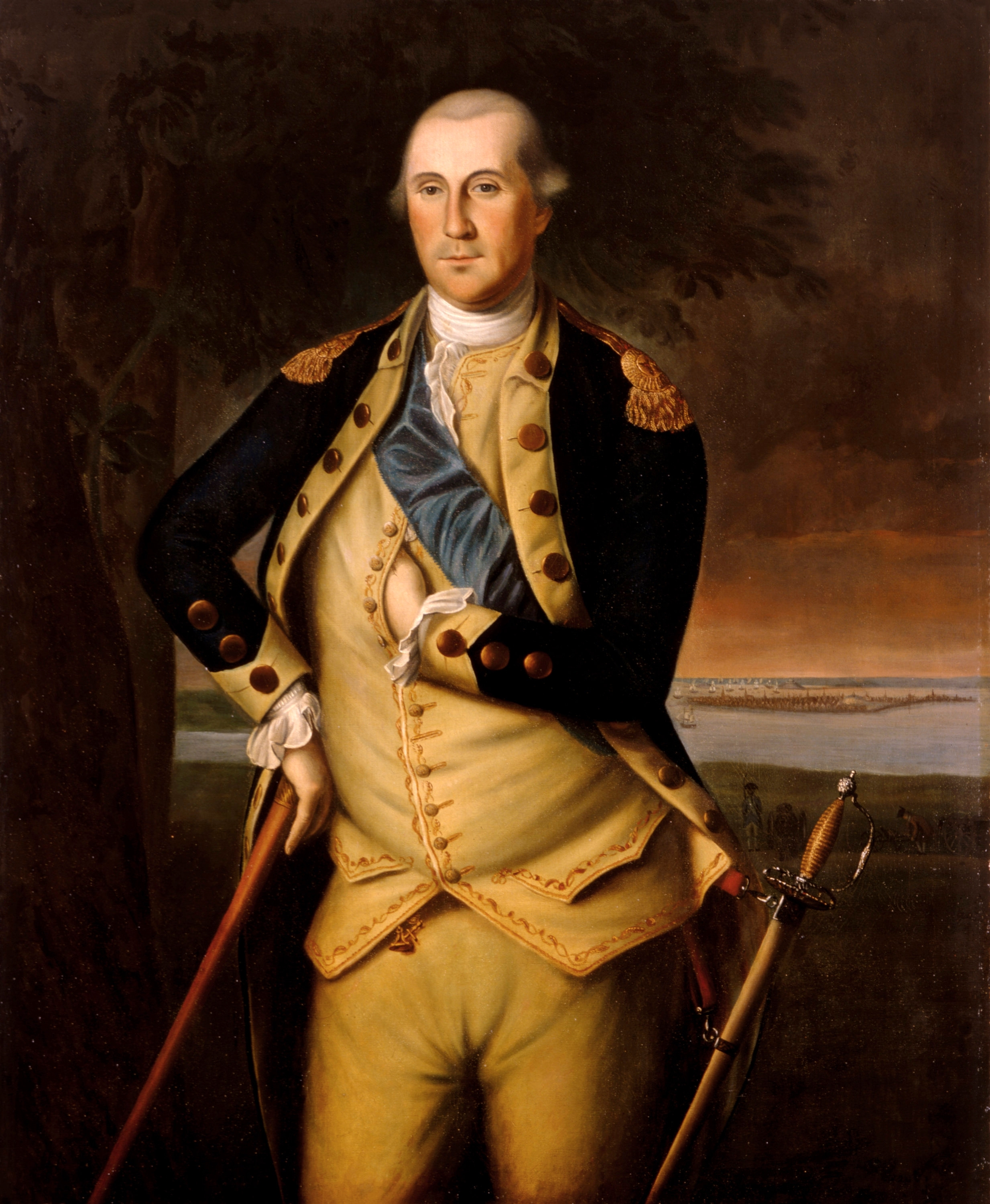
George Washington

- Washington arrives in Cambridge, Massachusetts to take command of the Continental Army (July 2)
- Declaration of the Causes and Necessity of Taking Up Arms issued (July 6), written by Jefferson and Dickinson, revised and adopted by Congress, explains why the Thirteen Colonies had taken up arms in what had become the American Revolutionary War.
- Olive Branch Petition adopted by the Second Continental Congress and sent to King George III (July 8), last ditch American effort for peace.
- King George III issues the Proclamation of Rebellion (August 23), de facto royal response to the Olive Branch Petition, dashing the hopes of loyalists and moderates; it declared anyone aiding the open rebellion to be traitors.

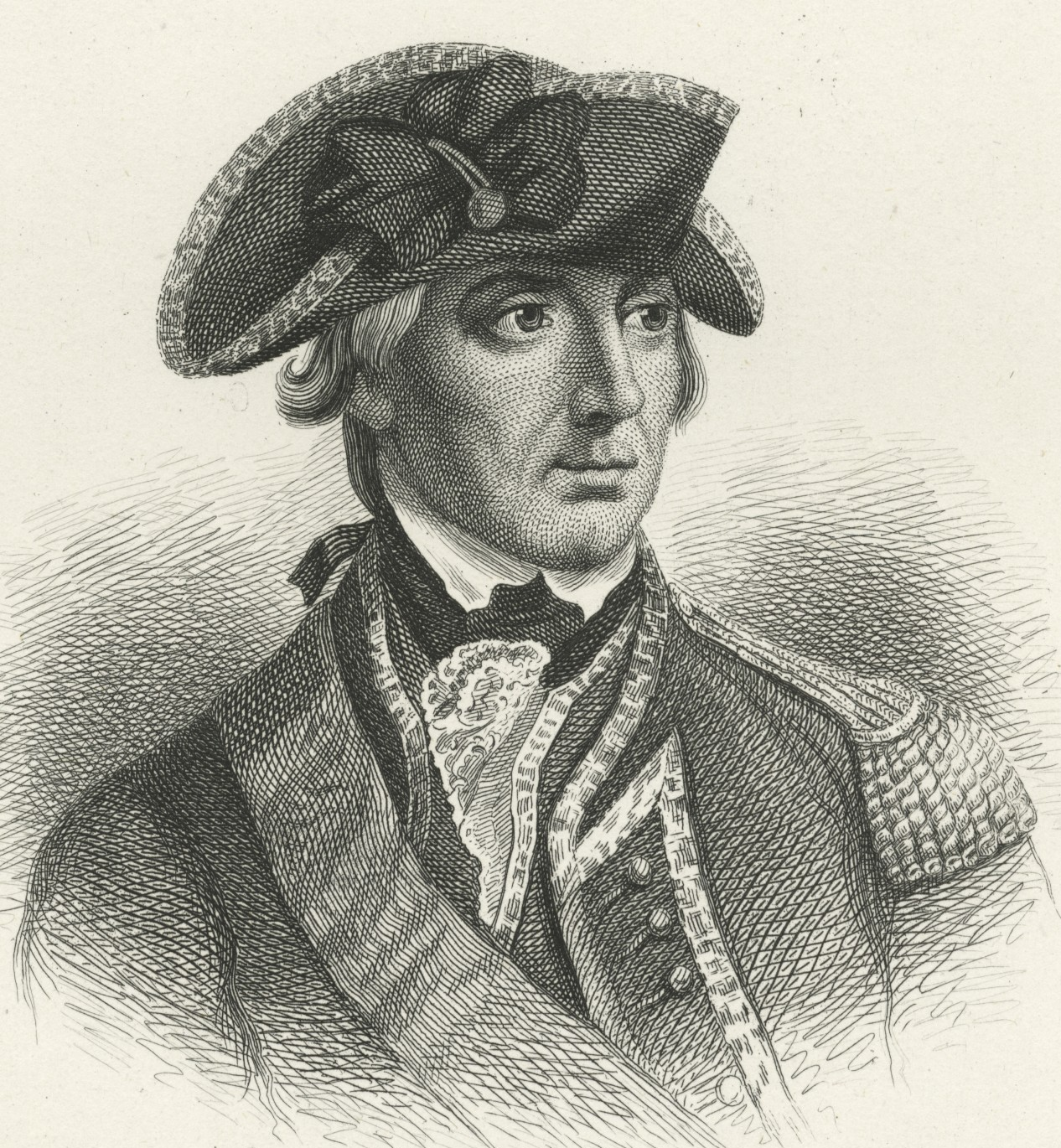
Gen. Wm. Howe

- Gen. William Howe replaces Gen. Thomas Gage as Commander-in-Chief of British forces in North America. September.
- Continental Navy established by the Second Continental Congress (October 13)
- Snow Campaign (November–December)
- Dunmore's Proclamation issued by Virginia royal governor Lord Dunmore, offering freedom to enslaved men held by rebel masters if they fight for the British (November 7)
- Hardliner Lord George Germain becomes chief architect of British policy in North America as Secretary of State for the American Department (Nov. 10). He served until 1782.
- Continental Marines established by Continental Congress. They would become the modern day United States Marine Corps (November 10)
- Battle of Kemp's Landing (November 15)
- Siege of Savage's Old Fields (November 19–21)

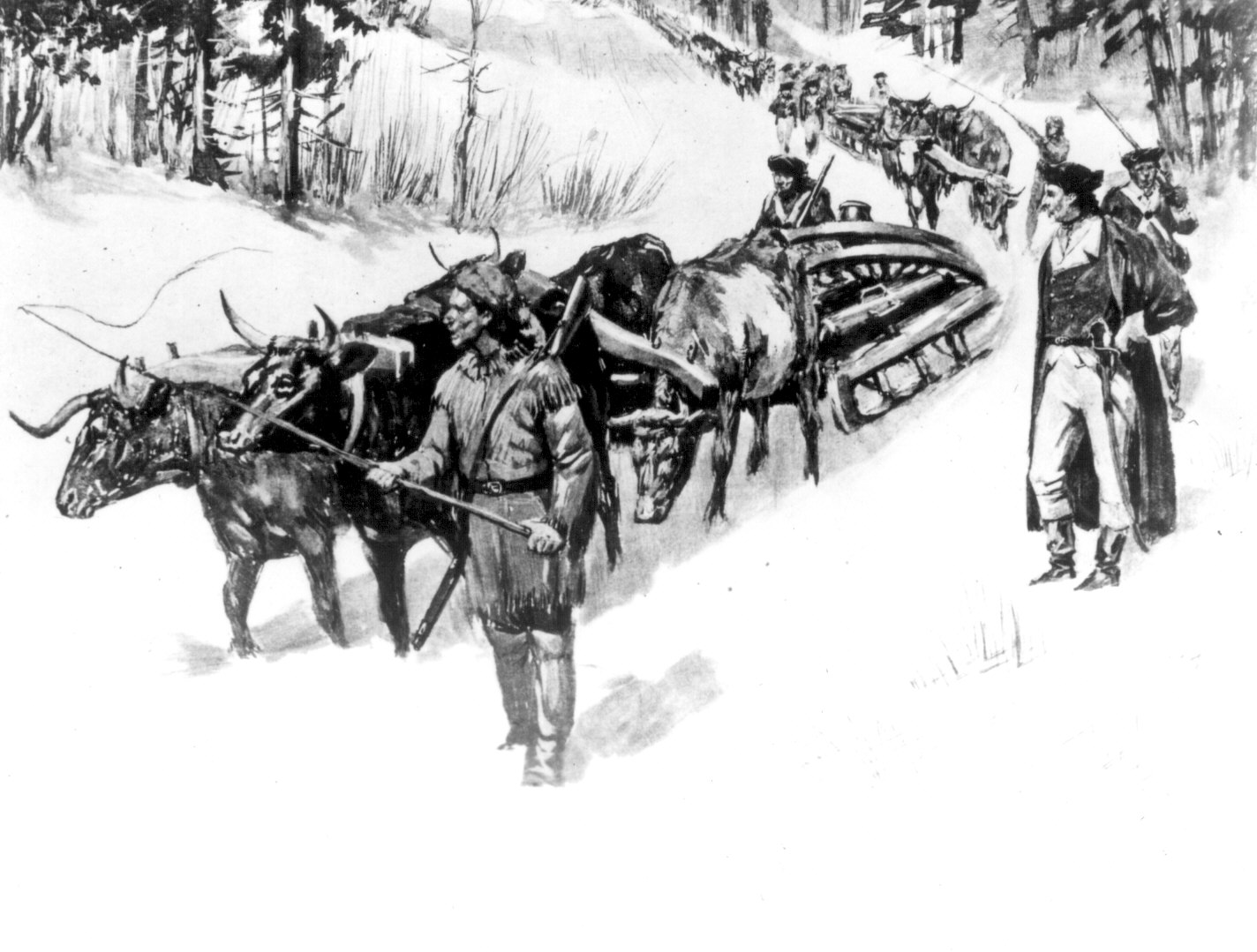
Cannons from Ft Ticonderoga

- Henry Knox transported fifty-nine captured cannons (taken from Fort Ticonderoga and Fort Crown Point) from upstate New York to Boston, Massachusetts; took 56 days to complete (December 5, 1775 – January 24, 1776)
- Battle of Great Bridge (December 9)

Gadsden Flag, "Don't Tread on Me"

- Gadsden Flag created by South Carolinian Christopher Gadsden first officially displayed. (Dec. 20)
- Battle of Quebec (December 31, 1775) major British victory; American Gen. Richard Montgomery killed, Gen. Benedict Arnold (then fighting for the Americans) wounded. French Canadians do not support the American invasion.

== 1776 ==
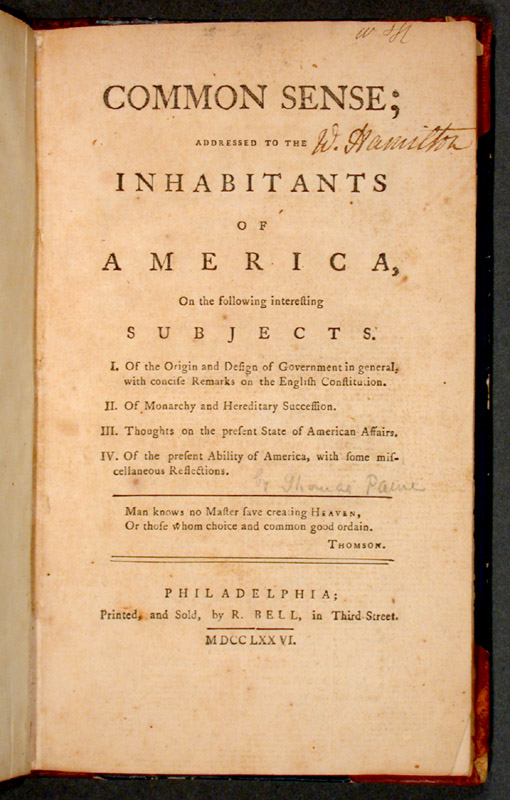
Common Sense

- Burning of Norfolk, Virginia (January 1)
- New Hampshire ratifies the first state constitution (January 5)
- Publication of Common Sense by Thomas Paine (January 10). It becomes a runaway bestseller, selling 500,000 copies, convincing many colonists that independence was the only course. George Washington owns a copy from the first printing.
- Publication of English philosopher Richard Price's Observations on the Nature of Civil Liberty, the Principles of Government, and the Justice and Policy of the War with America, justifying the American cause and refuting arguments for those policies. It goes through 13 printings after its first publication.
- David Mathews appointed Mayor of New York, the highest ranking civilian officer for English North America for the duration of the Revolution; New York City is strategically important and held by the British until the end of the war.
- Battle of Moore's Creek Bridge, North Carolina (February 27) North Carolina militia victory against Highlander Scots loyalists. North Carolina was not militarily threatened again until 1780. Memories of the battle negated efforts to recruit Loyalists in the area in 1781.
- Battle of the Rice Boats, Georgia (March 2–3)
- Battle of Nassau, Americans capture military stores, including gunpowder, and took the governor prisoner; first amphibious landing of the Continental navy (March 3–4)

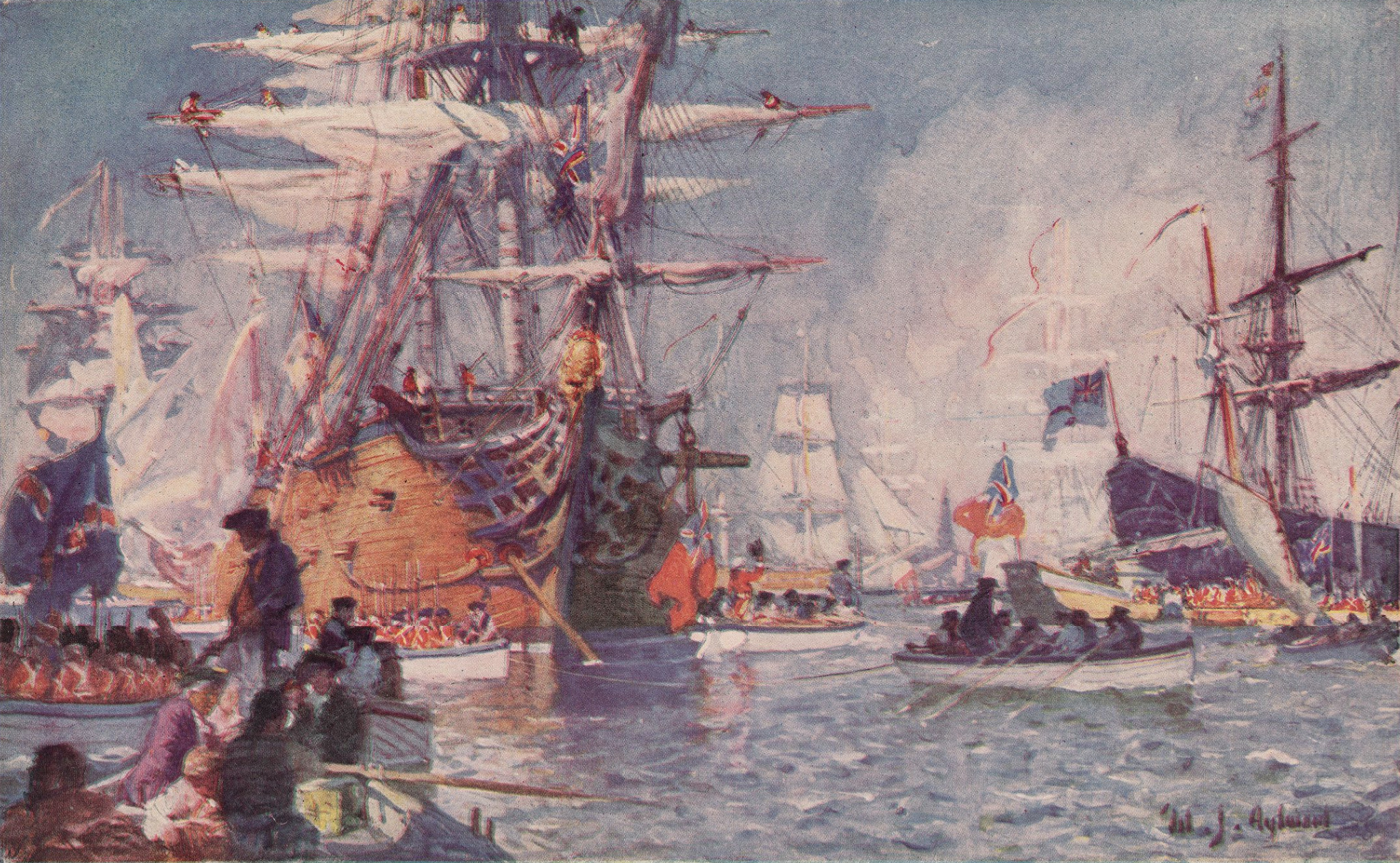
British forces evacuate Boston

- Fortification of Dorchester Heights, Boston - Continental Army under the command of George Washington installs cannons brought overland from Fort Ticonderoga NY to Boston, giving the Americans the ability to shell the British garrison and ships, forcing British forces evacuating Boston within two weeks. (March 4–5)
- British evacuate Boston (March 17), major victory for the Americans over the British, with the withdrawal of their forces after the yearlong Siege of Boston. This is the first example of the British forces being able to take a major American city, but being forced to abandon it.

Beaumarchais funnels covert aid from France to the Americans

- Silas Deane sent to France by the Continental Congress as a purchasing agent for the Continental Army (March). French king Louis XVI permits his foreign minister the Comte de Vergennes to lend £40,000 of covert French financial aid to the Americans against their longtime rivals.
- Roderigue Hortalez and Company founded in May in Paris to coordinate clandestine financial and military aid from France and Spain to the American rebels to weaken Britain, but unwilling to commit to open war.
- The Continental Army departs its first winter encampment at Cambridge, Massachusetts (April 4)
- Continental Congress opens American ports to trade with all other nations except Britain (April 6)
- Oliver Cromwell, a 20-gun corvette, launched in Connecticut (June 13). Named after the Puritan military and political leader, signatory of the death warrant of Charles I in 1649, Lord Protector of the Commonwealth of England until his death in office.
- Pennsylvania Provincial Conference (June 18–25) declares Pennsylvania's independence; mobilizes the Pennsylvania militia; organized elections for delegates to a constitutional convention that framed the Pennsylvania Constitution of 1776

Board of War

- Second Continental Congress establishes the a standing administrative body, the Board of War and Ordnance, to oversee the Continental Army. (June 12)
- Battle of Sullivan's Island (June 28)
- Thomas Hickey hanged for role in plot to assassinate George Washington (June 28). British Colonial Loyalist New York Mayor David Mathews previously arrested in Flatbush, Brooklyn for his role in the plot (June 22)
- Battle of Turtle Gut Inlet (June 29), American naval victory

Declaration of Independence, 1819 painting by John Trumbull

- Lee Resolution and Declaration of Independence – Second Continental Congress enacts the Lee Resolution declaring independence from the British Empire (July 2)
- Largest assembly of British naval fleet in history commences off the coasts of Staten Island, Brooklyn and New Jersey (July 3)
- Proclamation of the Declaration of Independence by the Second Continental Congress (July 4)

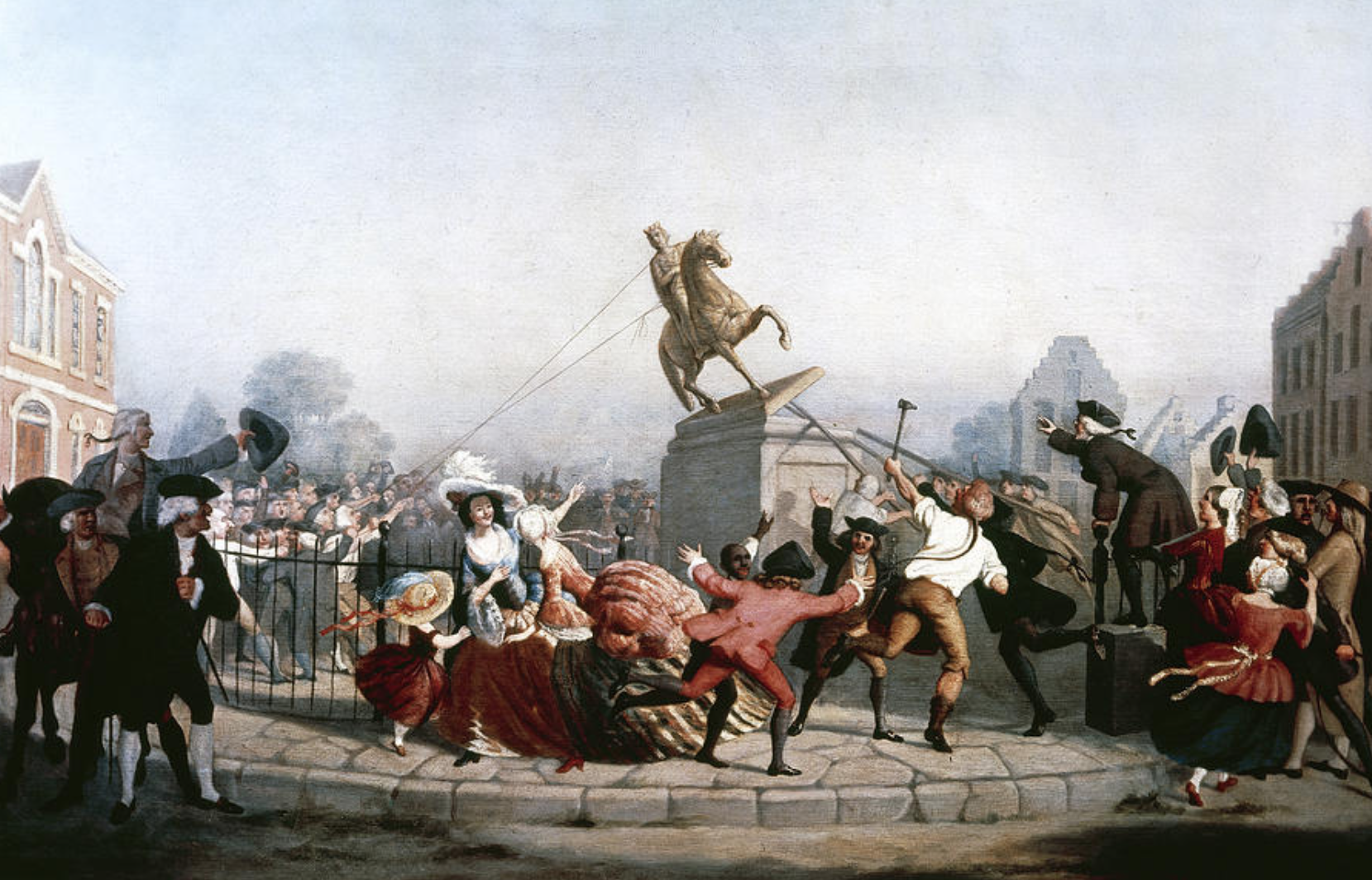
Statue of George III pulled down, New York City

- Sons of Liberty topple the statue of George III in Bowling Green; the lead in the statue was melted down and made into bullets (July 9)
- Battle of Island Flats, the opening battle of the west, pitting the American regional Patriot militia against the British allied Cherokee forces in the Overmountain region of the American frontier (July)
- Battle of Long Island, a.k.a. Battle of Brooklyn (August 27) – British victory; British occupation of New York for the duration of the war; Washington's largely intact forces escape capture, a repeated strategy in the war
- British prison ships begin in Wallabout Bay, New York

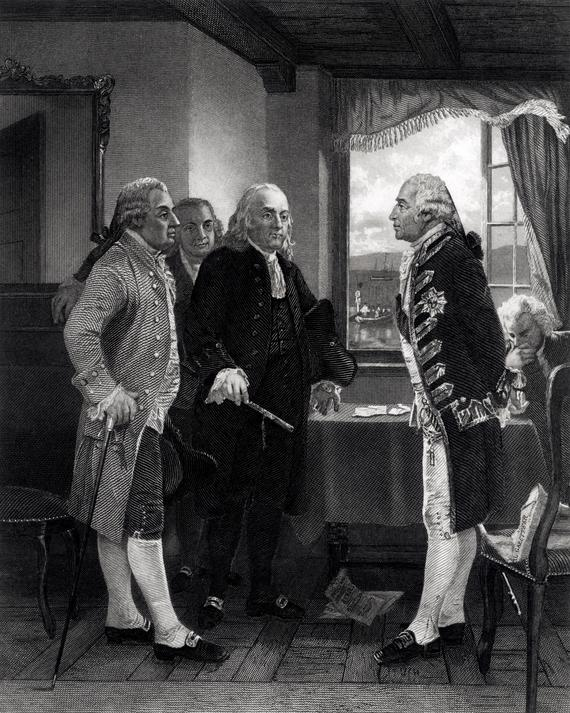
Staten Island Peace Conference

- Staten Island Peace Conference (September 11) unsuccessful meeting between British authorities and members of the Continental Congress (Ben Franklin, John Adams) to end armed hostilities; Americans refuse to rescind the Declaration of Independence (Sept. 11)
- Battles: Landing at Kip's Bay (September 15); Battle of Harlem Heights (September 16)
- Great Fire of New York (September 21–22)
- Nathan Hale captured and executed for espionage (September 22)
- Congress sends Benjamin Franklin and Arthur Lee to assist Silas Deane in Paris (Sept. 26)
- Battles: Battle of Valcour Island (October 11) British victory; Battle of Pell's Point, New York (October 18)* *Battle of White Plains, New York (October 29) British victory over George Washington
- Battle of Fort Cumberland (November 10–29)
- Battle of Fort Washington (November 16)
- Battle of Fort Lee (November 20)
- Charles Lee, Washington's third in command, is captured and held for 16 months (Dec. 13)
- Battle of Iron Works Hill (December 23–26)

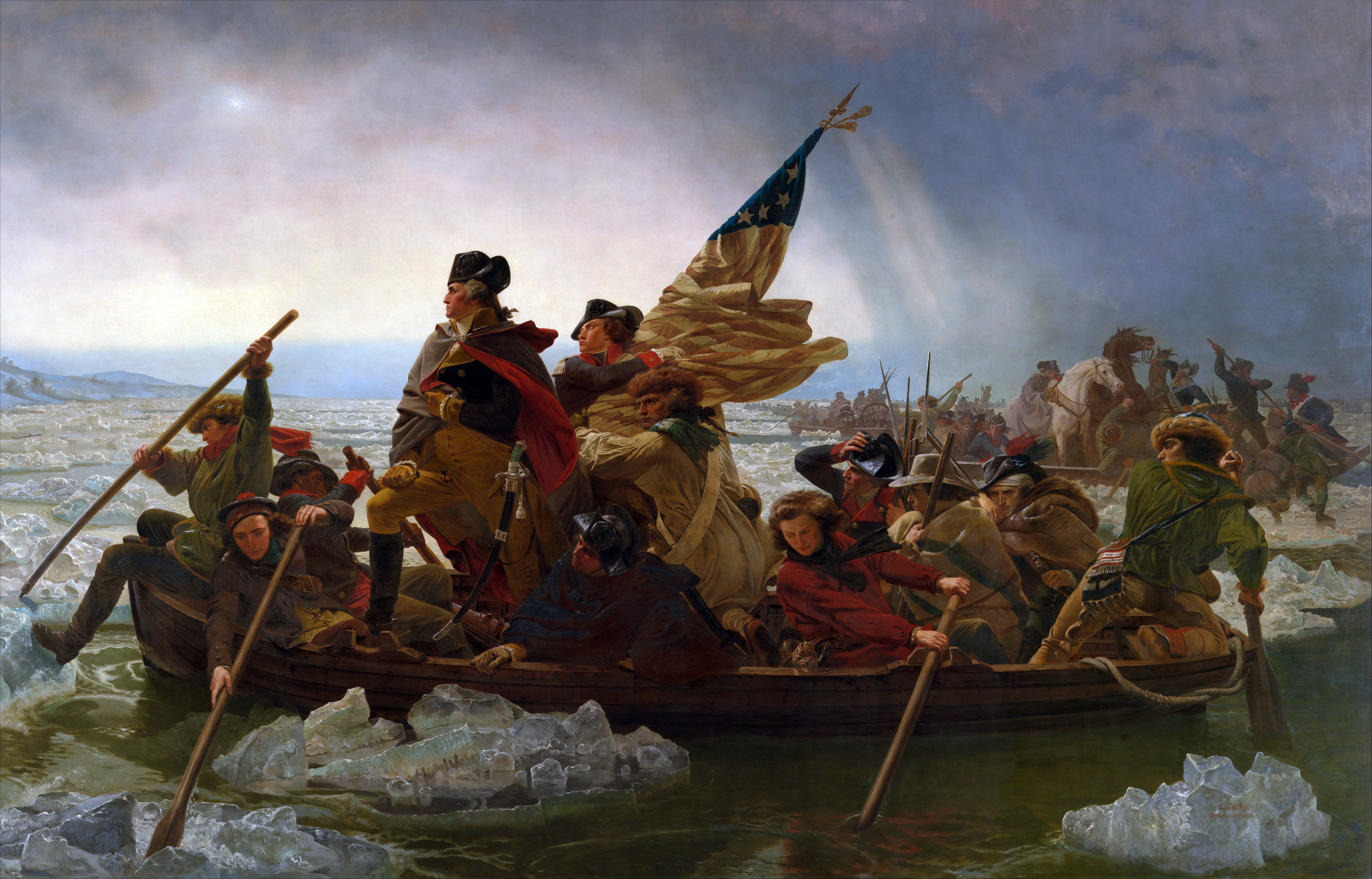
Washington Crossing the Delaware, painting 1851 by Emanuel Leutze

- Battle of Trenton (December 26) After a string of defeats and evasions of engagement with the British, and with Continental soldiers' enlistment about to expire, Washington needed a victory. His surprise attack on Hessian mercenaries captured the garrison, including 1,000 Hessians, a military victory and crucial psychological one for the Continental Army. Howe's army is forced to retreat from all British posts in New Jersey. The crossing of the Delaware River the night before the attack is an iconic image.
- Thomas Paine publishes The American Crisis, inspiring Americans to continue in their struggle (1776–1777)
- New York's Westchester County becomes the Neutral Ground between the two sides of the war for eight and a half years.

== 1777 ==
Early revolutionary flag with the Stars and Stripes, whose design was attributed to Betsy Ross, first used 1777

- Battles: Battle of the Assunpink Creek, also known as the Second Battle of Trenton (January 2); Battle of Princeton, New Jersey (January 3).
- Continental Army enters second winter encampment of the war at Morristown (January 6)
- Washington controversially orders smallpox inoculation for troops, which successfully prevented its spread. (February)
- Battles: Forage War (January–March), New Jersey; Battle of Bound Brook (April 13);British burn and loot Danbury, Connecticut (April 26); Battle of Ridgefield (April 27); Battle of Thomas Creek (May 17); Meigs Raid (May 23); First Middlebrook encampment (May 28 – July 2)
- Flag Act of 1777 passed by the Continental Congress specifying the stars and stripes. (June 14) Flag Day is celebrated on the anniversary, but it is not a federal holiday.
- Battles: Battle of Short Hills (June 26); Fort Ticonderoga abandoned by the Americans due to advancing British troops placing cannon on Mount Defiance (July 5);British retake Fort Ticonderoga, New York (July 6); Battle of Hubbardton (July 7)
- Delegates in Vermont, which was not one of the Thirteen Colonies, establish a republic and adopt a constitution, the first in what is now the territory of the United States to prohibit slavery (July 8)
- Battles: Battle of Fort Anne (July 8); Siege of Fort Stanwix (August 2–23); Battle of Oriskany (August 6); Battle of Machias (1777) (August 13–14); Battle of Bennington, Vermont (August 16); Battle of Staten Island, New York (August 22); Siege of Fort Henry (September 1); Battle of Cooch's Bridge (September 3)

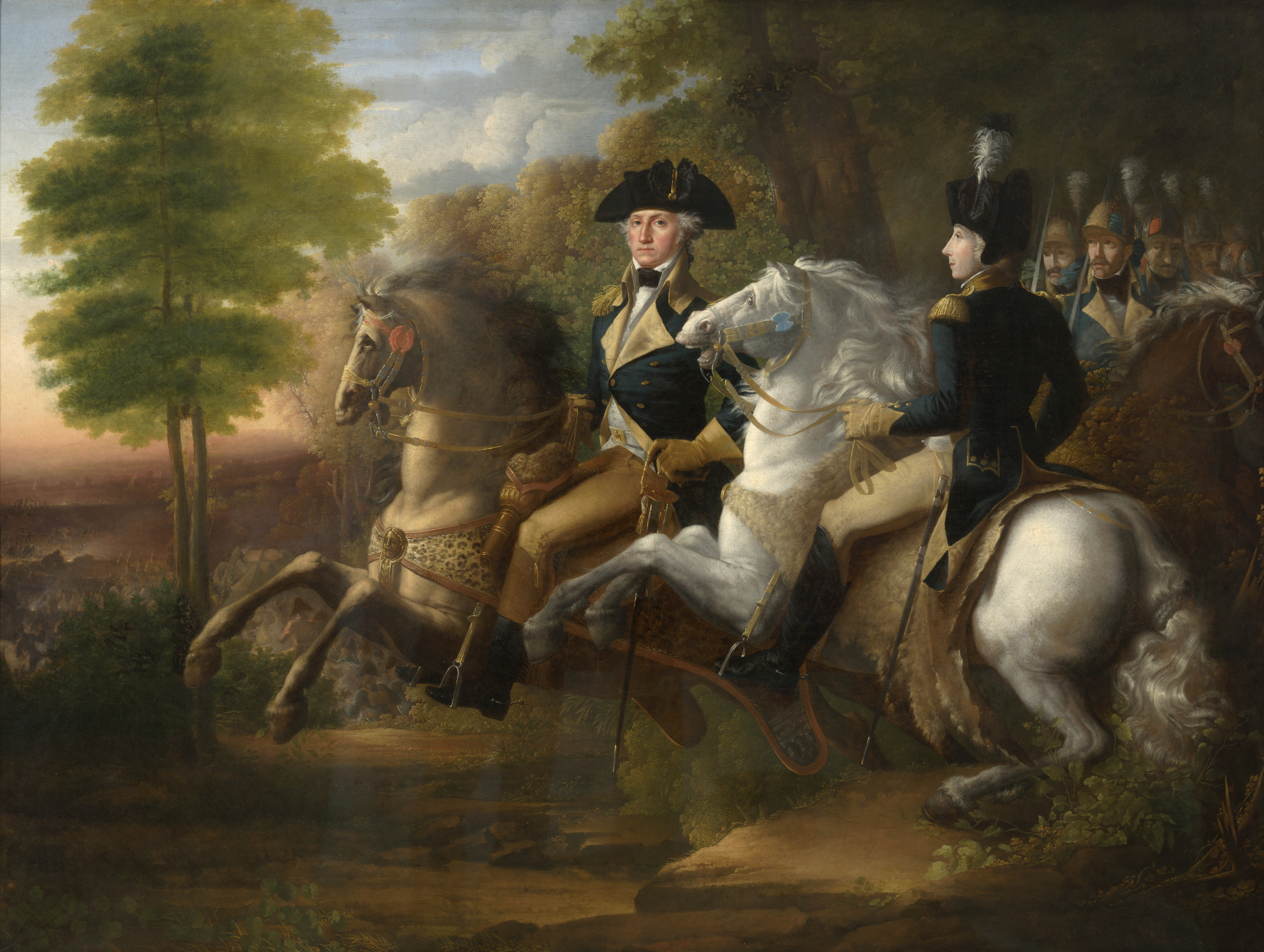
Washington and Lafayette at the Battle of Brandywine

- Battle of Brandywine (September 11), major British victory in Pennsylvania over George Washington's army in a set-piece battle of nearly equal forces.
- Battles: Battle of the Clouds (September 16); Battle of Paoli (Paoli Massacre) (September 20)
- British occupation of Philadelphia, the American capital (September 26)
- Battle of Germantown (October 4) British victory outside of Philadelphia, but the long-term strategic consequences favored the Americans, since Gen. Howe had failed to follow up on his success and allowed Washington and his army to escape, leading to their encampment at Valley Forge.

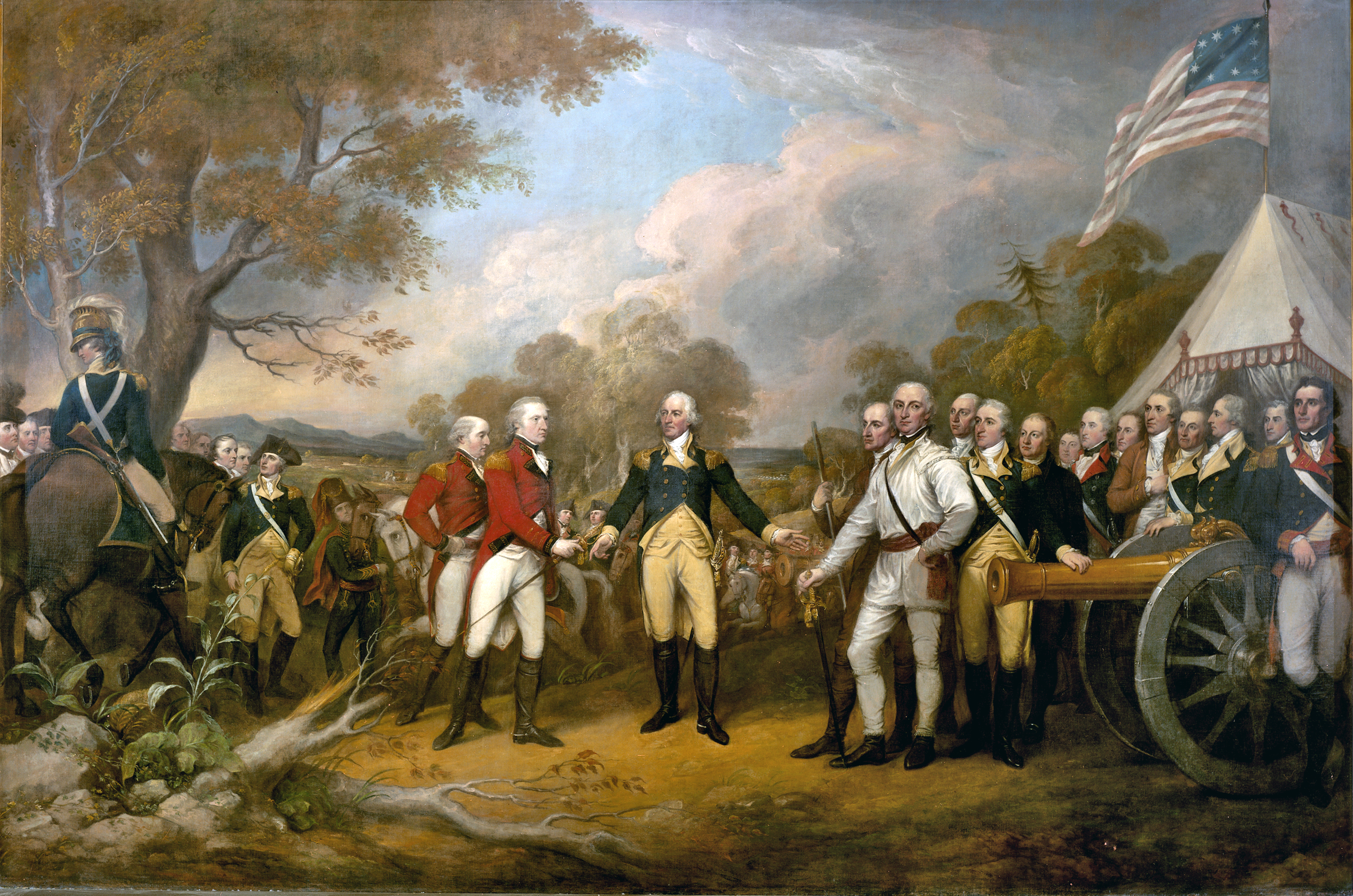
Surrender of General Burgoyne, 1821 painting by John Trumbull

- Battle of Forts Clinton and Montgomery (October 6)
- Battle of Saratoga (September 19 and October 7); surrender of the British army under General Burgoyne. Major American victory, demonstrating to France that the Americans could win in battle. The French now formally allied with the Americans in 1778, after providing covert aid since 1776.
- Convention of Saratoga signed Oct. 20 by Gen. Burgoyne of general Horatio Gates setting the terms of Burgoyne's surrender, allowing for the evacuation of his whole army to Britain. George Washington opposes the terms, arguing the British would redeploy them to fight the Americans again.
- Battle of Fort Mercer, New Jersey (October 22) American victory, a much-needed morale boost to the Americans, delaying British plans to consolidate gains in Philadelphia, and relieving pressure on the Continental Army, embedded north of Philadelphia.

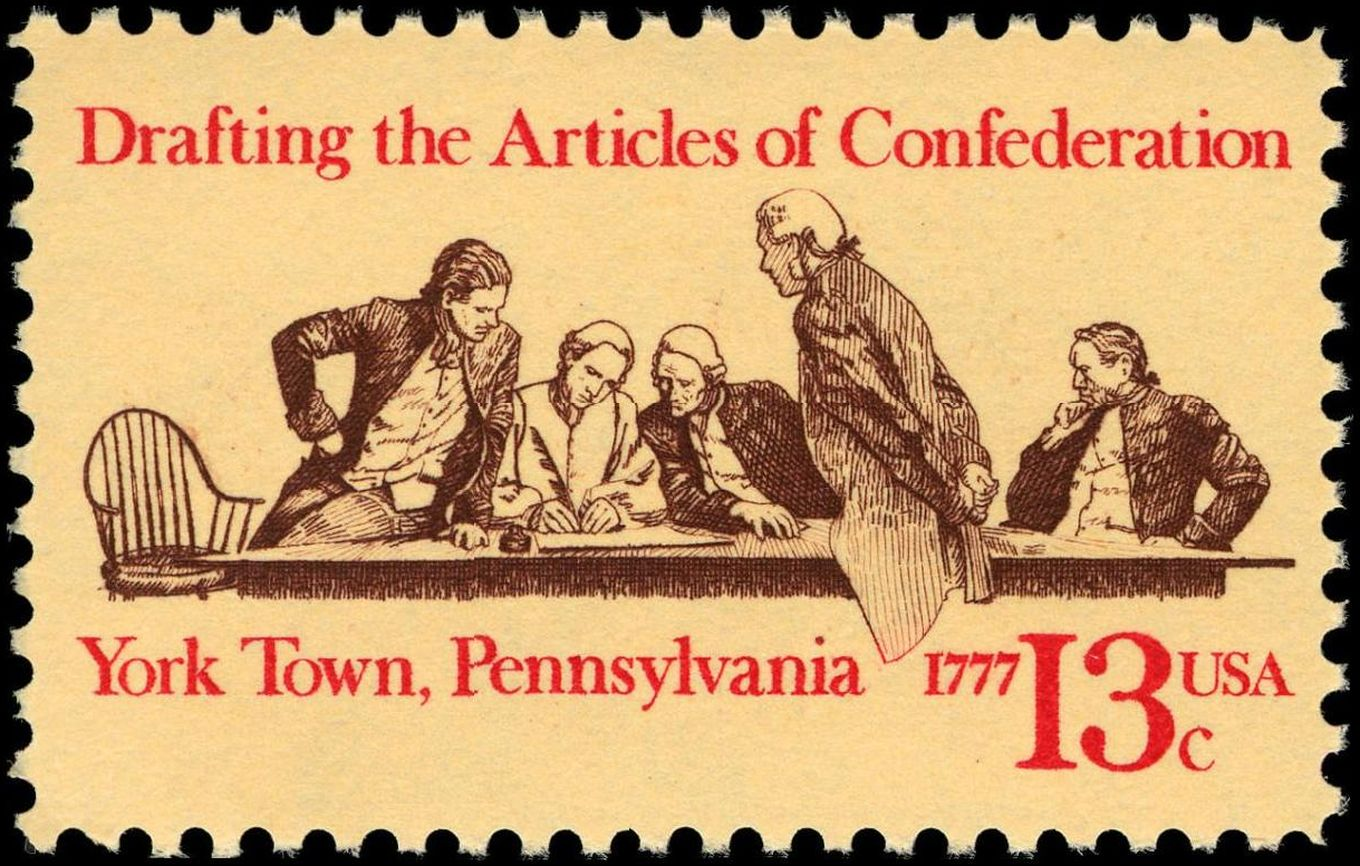
Bicentennial Commemorative stamp

- Articles of Confederation, formal legal framework for governance of the U.S. until 1787, adopted by the Second Continental Congress (November 15)
- Battles: Capture of Fort Mifflin, (November 16) and Fort Mercer, (November 18);Battle of Gloucester (1777) (November 25) Battle of White Marsh (December 5 – December 8); Battle of Matson's Ford (December 11)

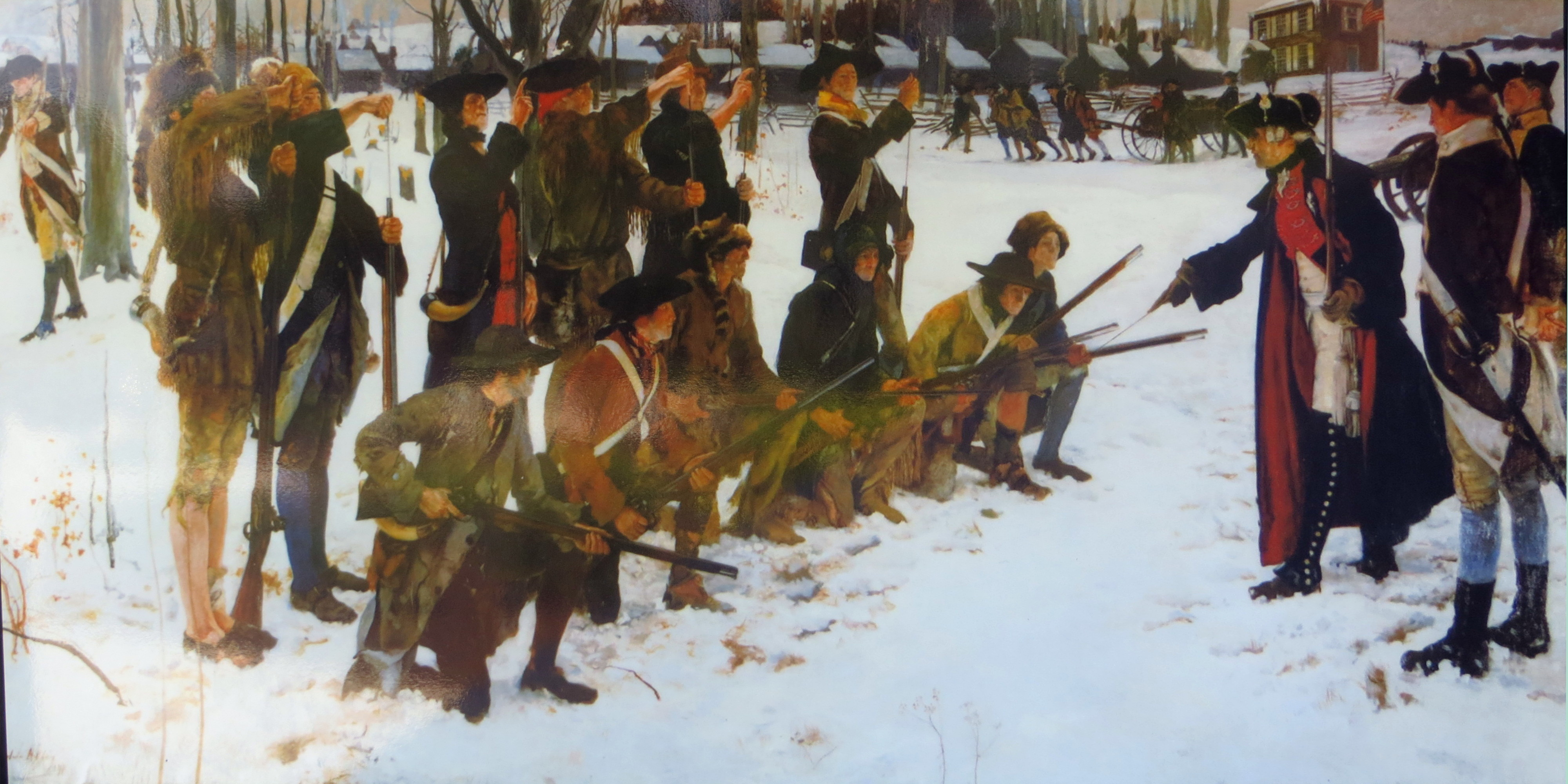
Baron von Steuben drills Continental soldiers at Valley Forge

- Continental Army in third winter quarters at Valley Forge (December 19, 1777 – June 19, 1778) Washington's army of 12,000 struggled to manage a disastrous supply crisis while simultaneously retraining and reorganizing their units in an effort to mount successful counterattacks against the British. During the encampment at Valley Forge, an estimated 1,700 to 2,000 soldiers died from disease, possibly exacerbated by malnutrition and cold, wet weather.

== 1778 ==
- George III in the wake of the defeat at Saratoga, tells Prime Minister Lord North that either Lord Germain, minister in charge of the war, or General Howe, supreme commander of the army in North America, must retire.
- Continental Congress rejects in January implementing the Convention of Saratoga, an agreement by British general John Burgoyne and American general Horatio Gates, which would have allowed the Convention Army that Burgoyne surrendered after losing the Battles of Saratoga to return to Britain on the promise the soldiers not return to America fight. The British and German troops remained prisoners until the 1783 end of the war.
- Charles James Fox opposition Whig MP, who dressed for Parliament in blue and buff, the colors of George Washington, introduces a bill to prohibit the government from sending more regular troops to fight in America, arguing that Britain needed the troops for its own security, since France was preparing for war. (February 2)

Coat of Arms of France

- American treaties of alliance with France with Treaty of Amity and Commerce and Treaty of Alliance (February 6). The full weight of the France, Britain's longstanding rival, provides crucial support (money, army and naval forces, war materiel) to the Americans. France is the first foreign country to recognize the flag of the United States, on the ship of John Paul Jones (February 14)
- France declares war on Great Britain, starting the Anglo-French War (1778–1783) and formally allying with the United States (March 17). The war is transformed from an insurgency within the British Empire and one of its component parts into a global conflict between Britain and France (and later its ally Spain), to undermine British dominance. Britain must rethink its war strategy since its lucrative Caribbean colonies and India are now vulnerable to attack and Britain itself could be invaded. British redeploy resources in North America, believing it can rely on Loyalists. The British over-estimate the number of Loyalists and their willingness to take up arms.
- Battle of Quinton's Bridge (March 18)

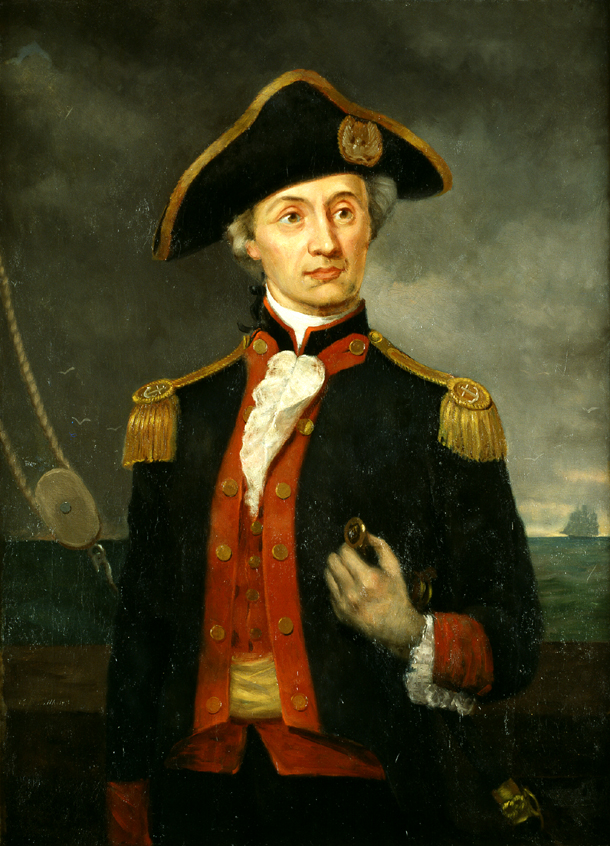
John Paul Jones

- John Paul Jones, Scottish-born commander of the American ship Ranger, attacks Whitehaven in England, America's first naval engagement outside North America (April 20)
- The Great Chain across the Hudson River is completed, blocking navigation (April 30)
- Battles: Battle of Crooked Billet (May 1)Battle of Barren Hill (May 20); Battle of Cobleskill (May 30)
- British troops evacuate from Philadelphia, redeploy to New York City (June 18)
- Whaleboat attack on Flatbush, Brooklyn to kidnap New York Mayor David Mathews and other British and Loyalist figures partially succeeds in securing Captain James Moncrief and Theophylact Bache, President of the New York Chamber of Commerce, for future prisoner exchange (June)
- Battles: Battle of Monmouth (June 28); Battle of Wyoming (July 3);
- Battle of Ushant, first naval engagement between the British and French, inconclusively fought in the English Channel. Britain feels the threat of a French invasion following their alliance with the Americans. (July 27)
- Treaty of Fort Pitt, first formal treaty between the United States and a Native American group, the Lenape, for military assistance (Sept. 17).
- Battle of Rhode Island (August 29); Baylor Massacre (September 27)
- Culper Spy Ring is begun (October)
- Battles; Battle of Chestnut Neck (October 6); Affair at Little Egg Harbor (October 15); Cherry Valley massacre (November 11)
- Battle of St. Lucia (December 15) (In the West Indies Between the French and the British)
- Capture of Savannah, Georgia, British victory, launching their southern strategy (December 29)
- Majority of Continental Army in fourth winter quarters at Middlebrook Cantonment (November 30, 1778 – June 3, 1779)
- Continental Army Major General Israel Putnam chooses Redding, Connecticut as his winter encampment to guard the storehouses in Danbury, Connecticut (1778–1779)

== 1779 ==
- USS Bonhomme Richard given by France to the Continental Navy. (February)
- Battles; Battle of Beaufort (February 3, 1779); Battle of Kettle Creek, Georgia (February 14) American victory over Loyalist forces; Siege of Fort Vincennes (February 23–25); Chesapeake raid (May 10–24);Battle of Stono Ferry (June 20)

Flag of Spain, ally of France

- Spain declares war on Great Britain in alliance with France but not in alliance with the U.S. to recover Gibraltar and Minorca; gives material and logistical support to the American Revolution (June 21)
- Battle of Grenada (July 6) (In the West Indies Between the French and the British)
- Battles: Tryon's raid (July 3–14); Battle of Norwalk (July 11);Battle of Stony Point (July 16); Battle of Minisink (July 22); Penobscot Expedition (July 24 – August 14); Battle of Paulus Hook (August 19); Sullivan Expedition (June 18 – October 3); Battle of Newtown (August 29); Capture of Fort Bute (September 7);Siege of Savannah (September 16 – October 18); Battle of Baton Rouge (September 21); Battle of Flamborough Head (September 23)
- Continental Army in fifth winter quarters at Morristown (December 1779 – May 1780)

== 1780 ==
- Congress establishes the first federal court - Court of Appeals in Cases of Capture to provide for final adjudication of appeals from state court prize cases involving disposition of ships and cargo allegedly seized from the British (January 15)
- Massachusetts Constitution formally recognizes Harvard College as an educational institution tasked with promoting “virtue and knowledge” to sustain free government.
- Battle of Cape St. Vincent Naval battle off the coast of Portugal; first major naval victory for the British over their European enemies in the war (January 16)
- A stockade known as Fort Nashborough is founded on the banks of the Cumberland River (January 28). Two years later, the site is renamed Nashville
- Some 8,000 British forces under General Henry Clinton arrive in Charleston, South Carolina, from New York (February 1)
- New York cedes to Congress its western claims, including territory west of Lake Ontario (February 1). In 1792, New York will sell the Erie Triangle to Pennsylvania
- Battles: Battle of Young's House (February 3);Battle of Fort Charlotte (March 2–14)

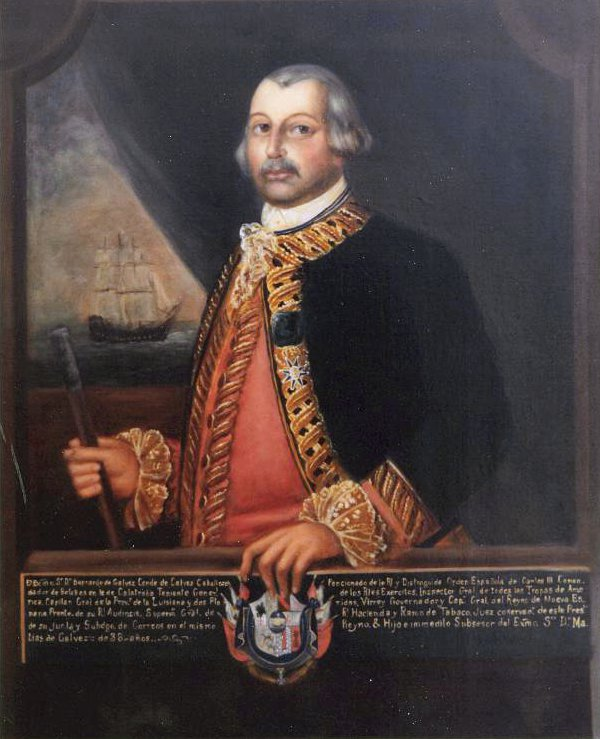
Viceroy Bernardo de Gálvez

- Spanish success against the British – Bombardment of Fort Charlotte, after a two-week siege, Spanish general, colonial governor of Louisiana, and Viceroy of New Spain Bernardo de Gálvez captures Fort Charlotte, taking the port of Mobile (in present-day Alabama) from the British (March 14). Fort Charlotte was the last remaining British frontier post capable of threatening New Orleans in Spanish Louisiana. Its fall drove the British from the western reaches of West Florida and reduced the British military presence in West Florida to its capital, Pensacola.
- Siege of Charleston (March 29 – May 12). Successful British siege of the major southern colonial port. British Army troops under General Henry Clinton and naval forces under Admiral Mariot Arbuthnot besiege Charleston, South Carolina. British ships sail past Fort Moultrie on Sullivan's Island to occupy Charleston Harbor (April 8); Battle of Monck's Corner (April 14); Battle of Lenud's Ferry (May 6); Fort Moultrie falls to the British (May 7); American General Benjamin Lincoln surrenders Charleston to the British. The British lose 255 men while capturing a large American garrison (May 12)
- Battle of Martinique (1780) (April 17) (In the West Indies)
- Richmond replaces Williamsburg, Virginia as the state capital for strategic reasons against British attack by sea (April 18)
- Bird's invasion of Kentucky (May 25 – August 4) (In the west)
- Battle of Waxhaws; a clash between Continental Army forces under Abraham Buford and a mainly Loyalist force led by Banastre Tarleton occurs near Lancaster, South Carolina in the Waxhaws area (close to present-day Buford). The British destroyed the American forces (May 29)
- Battles: Battle of Connecticut Farms (June 7); Battle of Mobley's Meeting House (June 10); Battle of Ramsour's Mill (June 20); Battle of Springfield; with the attempted British invasion of New Jersey stopped at Connecticut Farms and Springfield, major fighting in the North ends (June 23)
- Robert Morris is appointed Superintendent of Finance, a post akin to Prime Minister, by Congress (June 27)

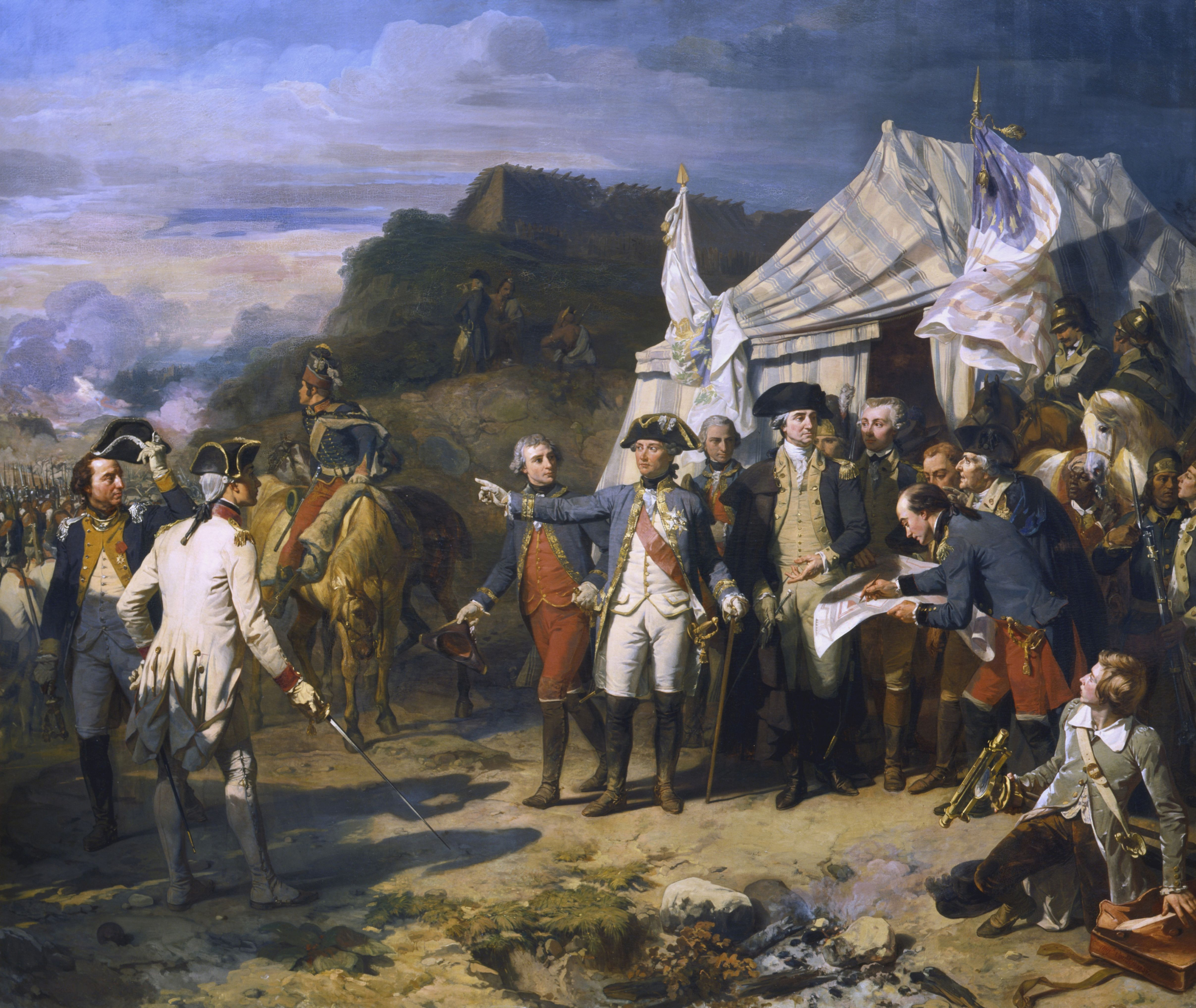
Rochambeau and Washington

- French troops arrive in Rhode Island under Rochambeau (July 11). France sent 7,000 troops under the command of the Comte de Rochambeau, who served with George Washington as part of the Franco-American Alliance.
- Battles: Battle of Williamson's Plantation (AKA Huck's Defeat) (July 12)Battle of Bull's Ferry (July 20–21); Battle of Colson's Mill (July 21); Battle of Rocky Mount (August 1); Battle of Hanging Rock (August 6); Battle of Piqua (August 8)July 11)
- John Adams arrives in the Dutch Republic to secure loans and bring the Dutch into the war, lessening the American dependence on France (August 10)

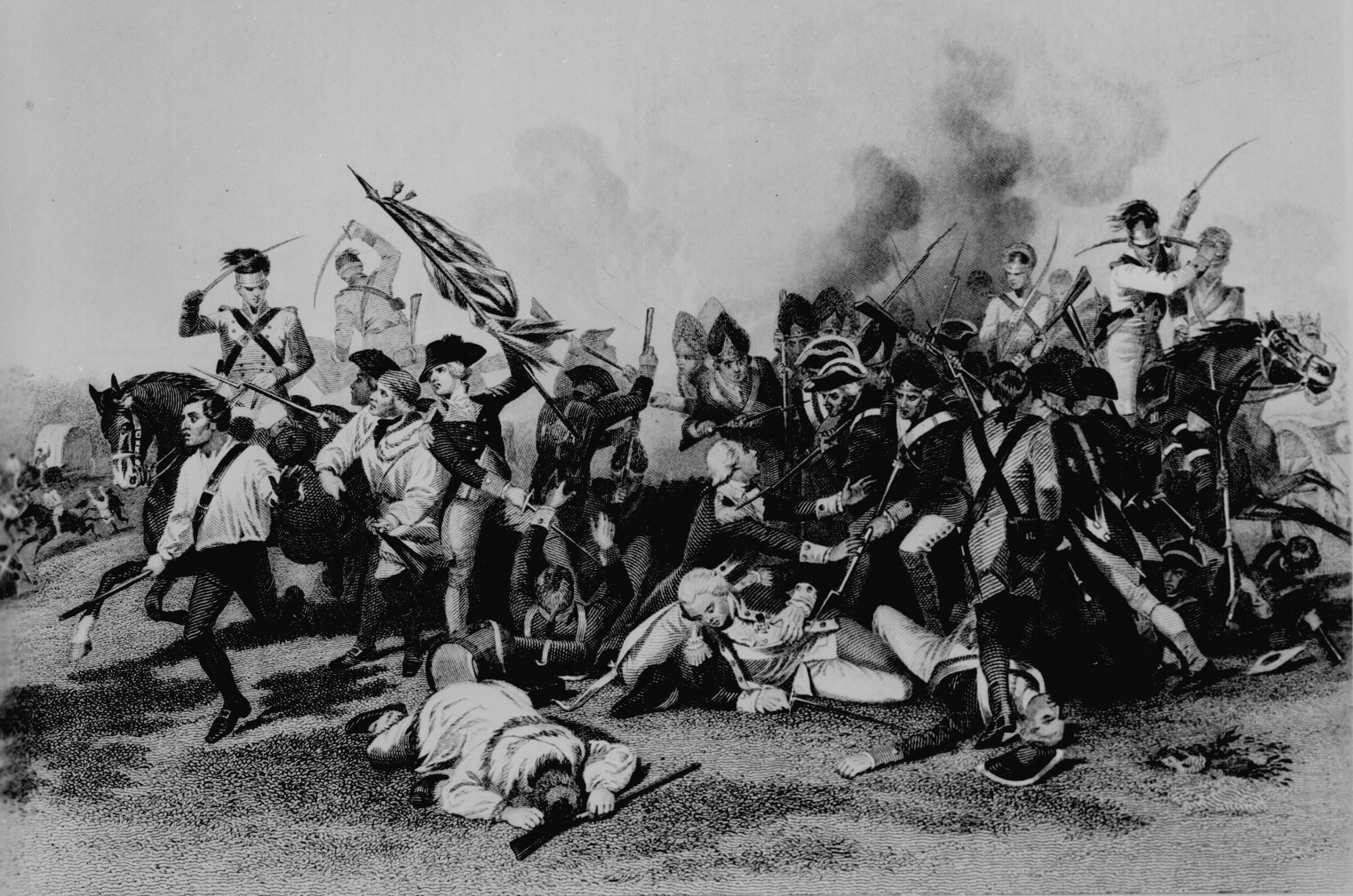
Battle of Camden, British victory, death of de Kalb in battle

- Battle of Camden, major British victory over the Americans in South Carolina. General Cornwallis defeats Gates (August 16)
- Battles: Battle of Fishing Creek (August 18); Battle of Musgrove Mill (August 18);Battle of Black Mingo (August 28); Battle of Wahab's Plantation (September 21)

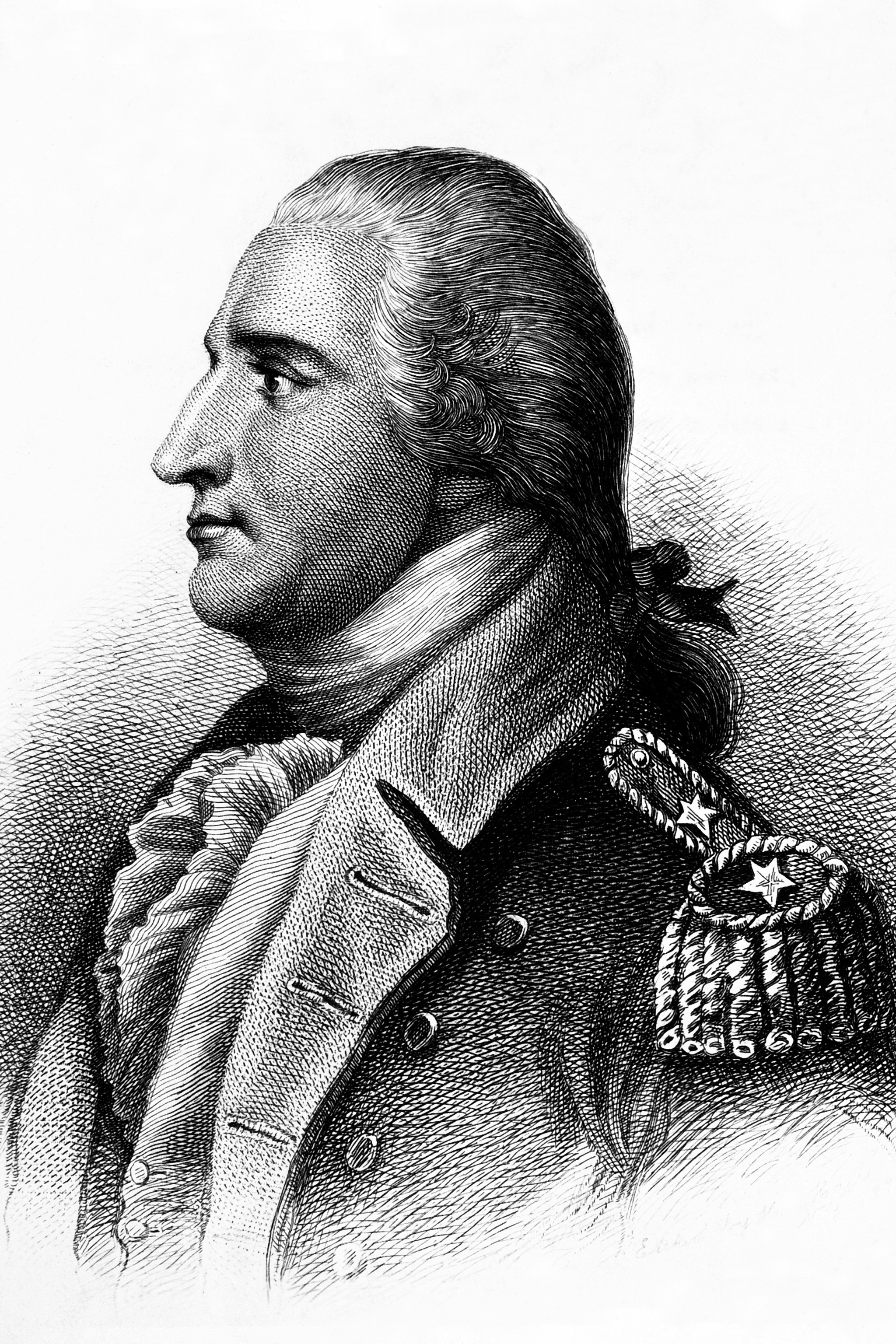
Benedict Arnold

- Treason of Gen. Benedict Arnold exposed; Major John André captured and executed as spy. (September 23) Arnold becomes a British general and recruits Loyalists
- Battle of Charlotte (September 26)
- Battle of Kings Mountain, South Carolina, American militia victory against Loyalist militias in the southern campaign, following a string of American defeats, greatly raising their morale. (October 7)
- Royalton Raid (October 16); Battle of Klock's Field (October 19); Battle of Fishdam Ford (November 9);Battle of Blackstock's Farm (November 20)
- Henry Laurens, American diplomat, captured by the British en route from the Dutch Republic while carrying a draft treaty between the U.S. and the Dutch. Laurens later exchanged for Lord Cornwallis in a prisoner swap.
- Britain declares war on the Dutch Republic, known as the Fourth Anglo-Dutch War, to prevent it from joining the League of Armed Neutrality and expanding the global conflict. (Dec. 20)
- Continental Army enters sixth winter with encampments in New York's Hudson Highlands, Pompton, and Morristown, New Jersey (December)

== 1781 ==
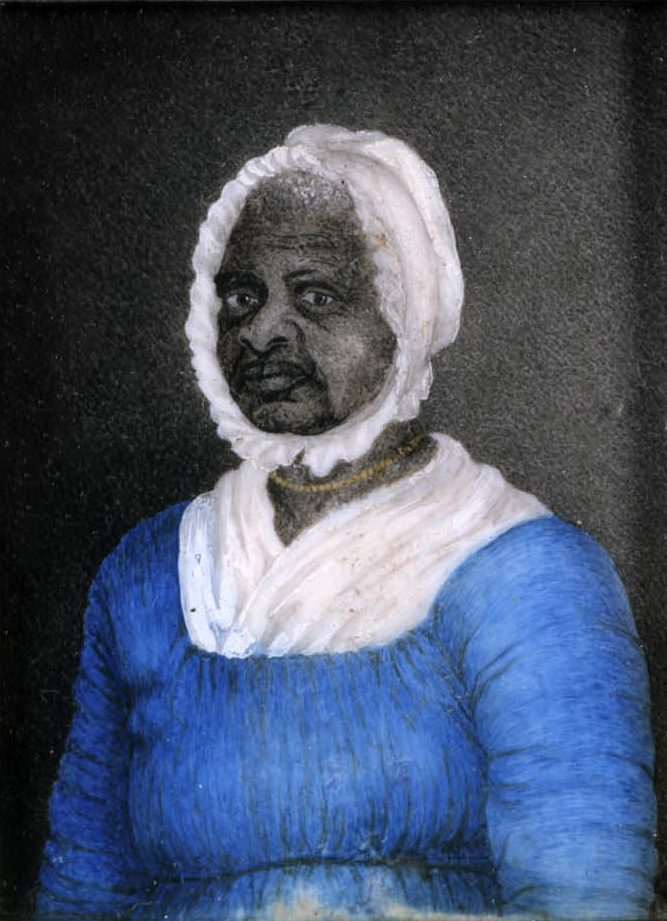
Elizabeth Freeman

- Successful Massachusetts lawsuit, Brom and Bett v. Ashley, by an enslaved black woman for her freedom, arguing that the state constitution guaranteed liberty and equality; she took the name Elizabeth Freeman. In effect, the decision ended slavery in the state.
- The future King William IV, the only active member of the British royal family to visit the former 13 colonies, takes up residence in the Rose and Crown Tavern on Staten Island.
- Pennsylvania Line Mutiny (January 1–29)
- Raid on Richmond (January 1–19)

Battle of Cowpens, S.C.

- Battle of Cowpens (January 17)
- Pompton Mutiny (January 20)
- Battle of Cowan's Ford (February 1)
- Capture of Sint Eustatius (February 3)
- Pyle's Massacre (February 24)
- Articles of Confederation ratified (March 1)
- Siege of Pensacola culminates Spain's conquest of West Florida (March 9 – May 10)
- Battle of Guilford Court House (March 15)
- Battle of Cape Henry (March 16)
- Siege of Fort Watson (April 15 – April 23)
- Battle of Blandford (April 25)
- Battle of Hobkirk's Hill (April 25)
- Action at Osborne's (April 27)
- Siege of Fort Motte (May 8–12)
- Siege of Pensacola (March 9 to May 10)
- Siege of Augusta, Georgia by British (May 22 – June 6)
- Siege of Ninety-Six (May 22 – June 19)
- Invasion of Tobago (May 24 – June 2) (In the West Indies Between the French and the British)
- Raid of Point of Fork (June 5)
- Washington–Rochambeau Revolutionary march. Joint French-American military campaign (June 10 – September 22)
- Battle of Green Spring, Virginia. British victory over the Franco-American forces; last major land battle before Yorktown (July 6)

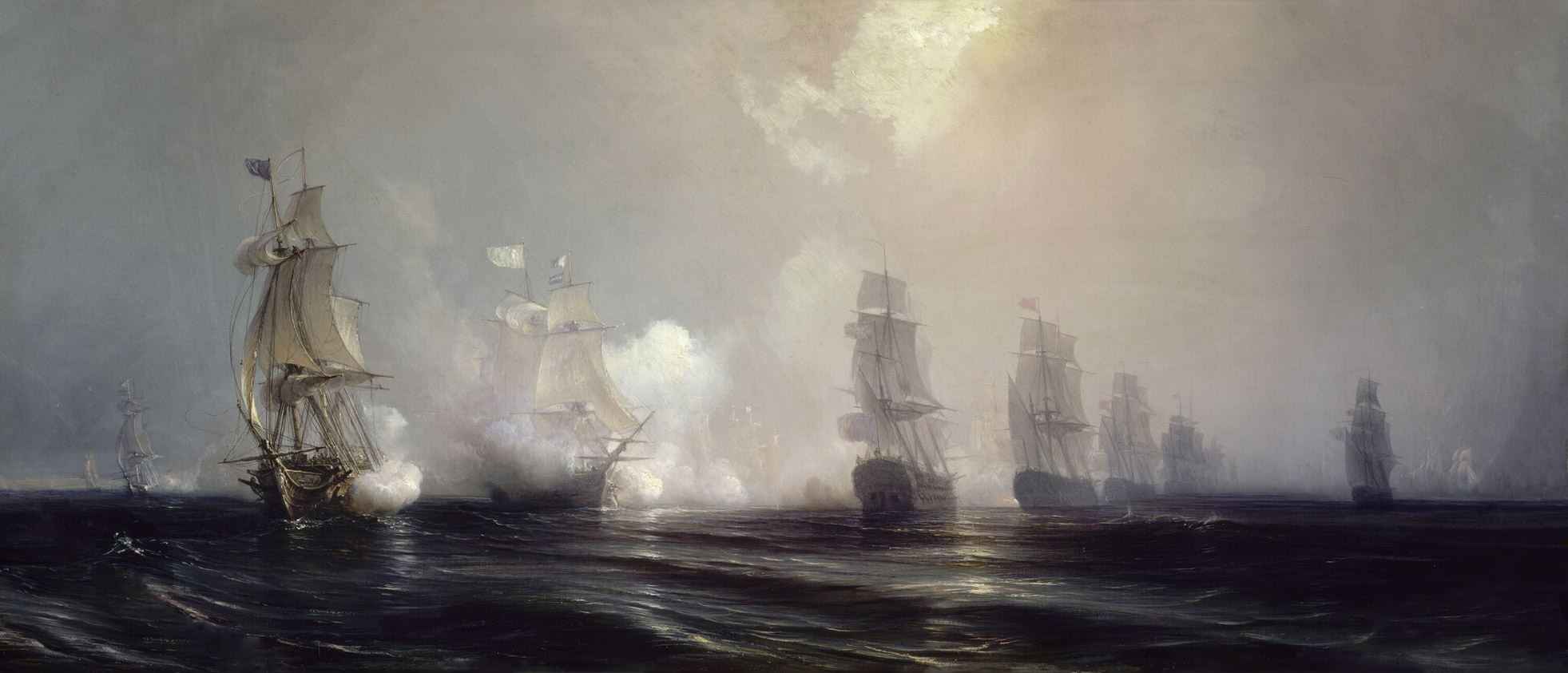
Battle of the Chesapeake

- Francisco's Fight (July 9–24)
- Battle of the Chesapeake, huge French naval victory over the British navy; France can now prevent the relief of Cornwallis in Yorktown and he is forced to surrender his army to the joint American-French army (September 5)
- Battle of Groton Heights (September 6)

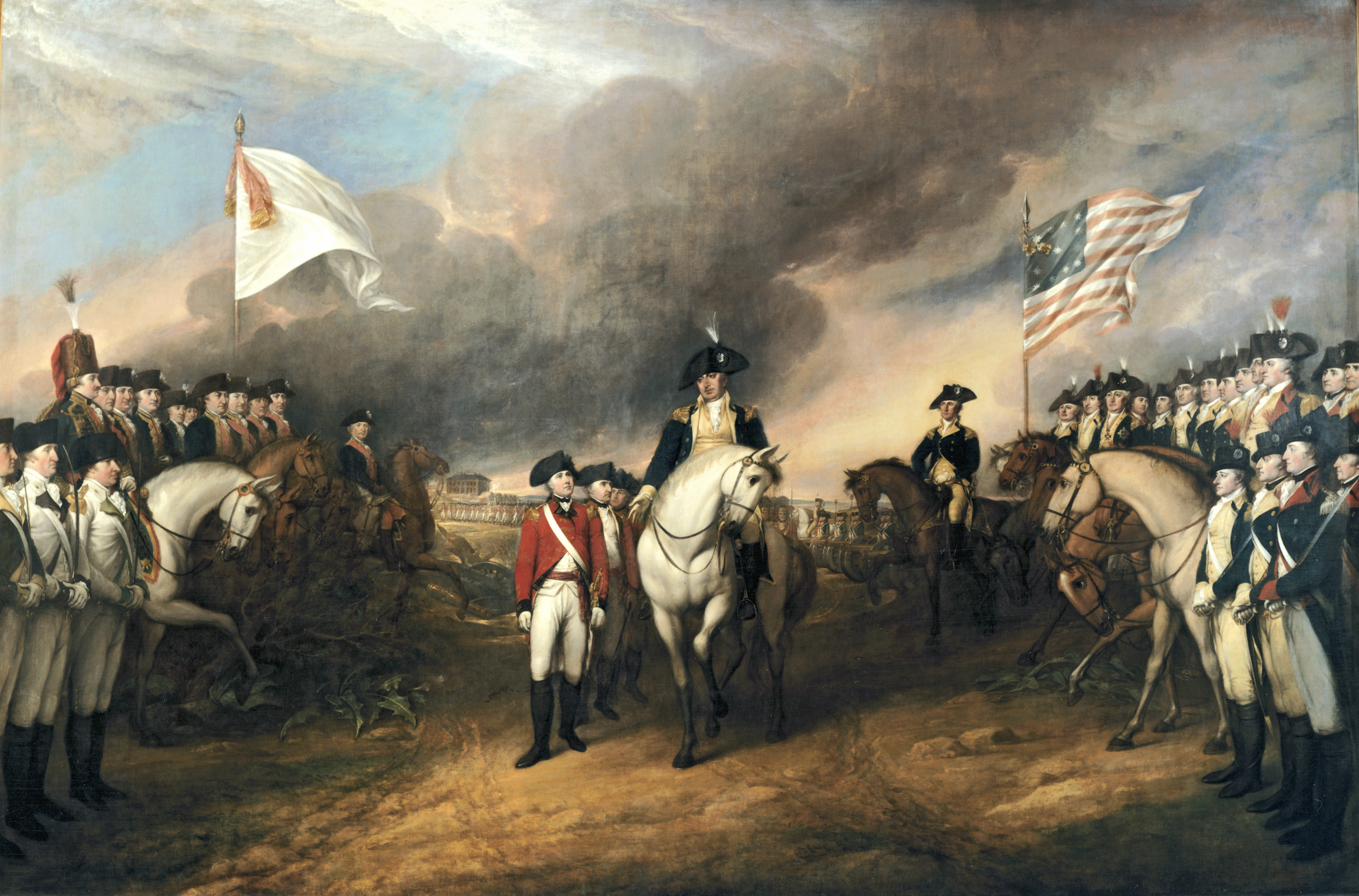
Cornwallis surrenders at Yorktown, Virginia

- Battle of Eutaw Springs (September 8)
- The British surrender at Yorktown, effective end of the land war in North America. (Oct. 19) Joint French-American armies of Washington and Rochambeau and the French navy trap Cornwallis and force the surrender of his entire army. War continues on other fronts until the Peace Treaty of 1783.
- News of Cornwallis's surrender reaches the British government (Sept 25). Leaders inform Prime Minister North of the defeat, who exclaimed: "O God! It is all over!"
- Continental Army returns to Hudson Highlands and Morristown New Jersey for its seventh winter encampment (December)
- Bank of North America chartered (December 31)

== 1782 ==
- Battle of Saint Kitts, naval battle in the West Indies between a British fleet under Rear Admiral Sir Samuel Hood and a larger French fleet under François Joseph Paul de Grasse. British victory.(Jan. 25–26)
- The British House of Commons votes against further war, informally recognizing American independence (February 27)

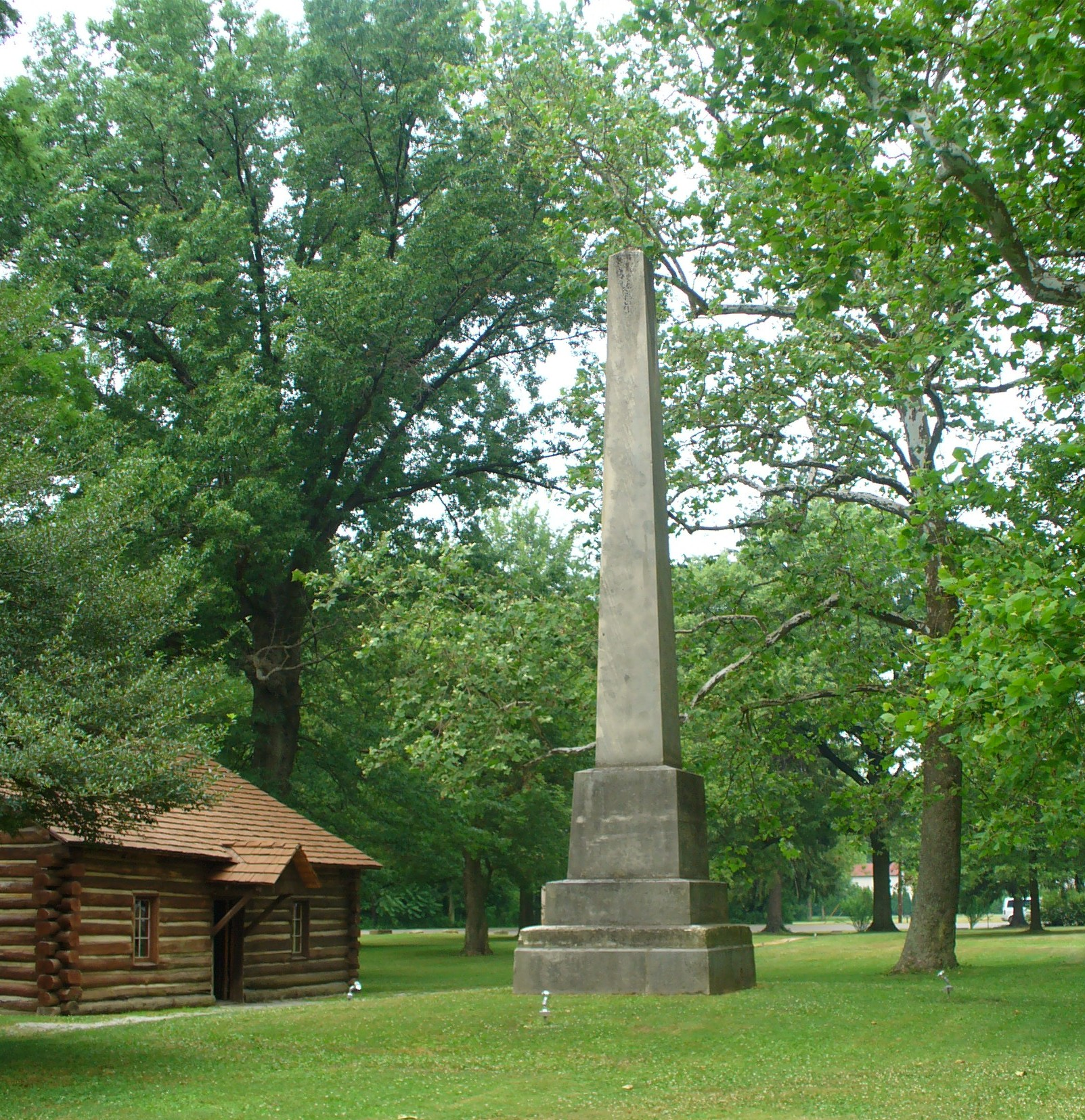
Gnadenhutten monument, erected in 1872, honoring the murdered Christian Native Americans

- Gnadenhutten massacre, murder and scalping of 96 Christian pacifist Moravian Native Americans by Pennsylvania militiamen, an attack based on the race of the victims. In 1889, Theodore Roosevelt called the atrocity "a stain on frontier character that the lapse of time cannot wash away." (March 8)
- Battle of Little Mountain (March 22)
- Newburgh letter sent to George Washington by Lewis Nicola (May 22)
- Crawford expedition (May 25 – June 12)
- British evacuate Savannah, Georgia (July 11)
- Siege of Bryan Station (August 15–17)
- Battle of Blue Licks (August 19)
- Battle of the Combahee River (August 27)
- Siege of Fort Henry (1782) (September 11–13)
- Continental Army moves into its eighth and final winter quarters, at the New Windsor Cantonment and in the Hudson Highlands (November)
- Preliminary Articles of Peace are signed by British negotiator Richard Oswald and representatives of the United States of America (November 30)
- British evacuate Charleston, South Carolina (December 14)
- Last skirmish of the conflict takes place near Cedar Bridge Tavern in Barnegat Township, New Jersey (December 27)

== 1782–1783 ==
- House of Commons votes to suspend the war in America (27 February 1782); Lord North resigns
- Rockingham becomes Prime Minister, pursues peace (March 27-July 1)
- Preliminary terms for peace between Britain and Americans: British recognition of U.S. independence; British pledge withdrawal of troops; U.S. ceded land in the Great Lakes and Ohio; U.S. granted fishing rights off of Newfoundland (30 November 1782)
- George Washington, citing a clause in the preliminary treaty, insisted on the return of any present or former slaves. Instead, the British evacuate Black Loyalists, former slaves, to British North America, documenting the individuals in the 150-page Book of Negroes, compiled in New York City by Brigadier General Samuel Birch, under the direction of Sir Guy Carleton. The book records names and descriptions of 3,000 Black Loyalists, enslaved Africans who were evacuated to points in Nova Scotia as free people of color.

== 1783 ==
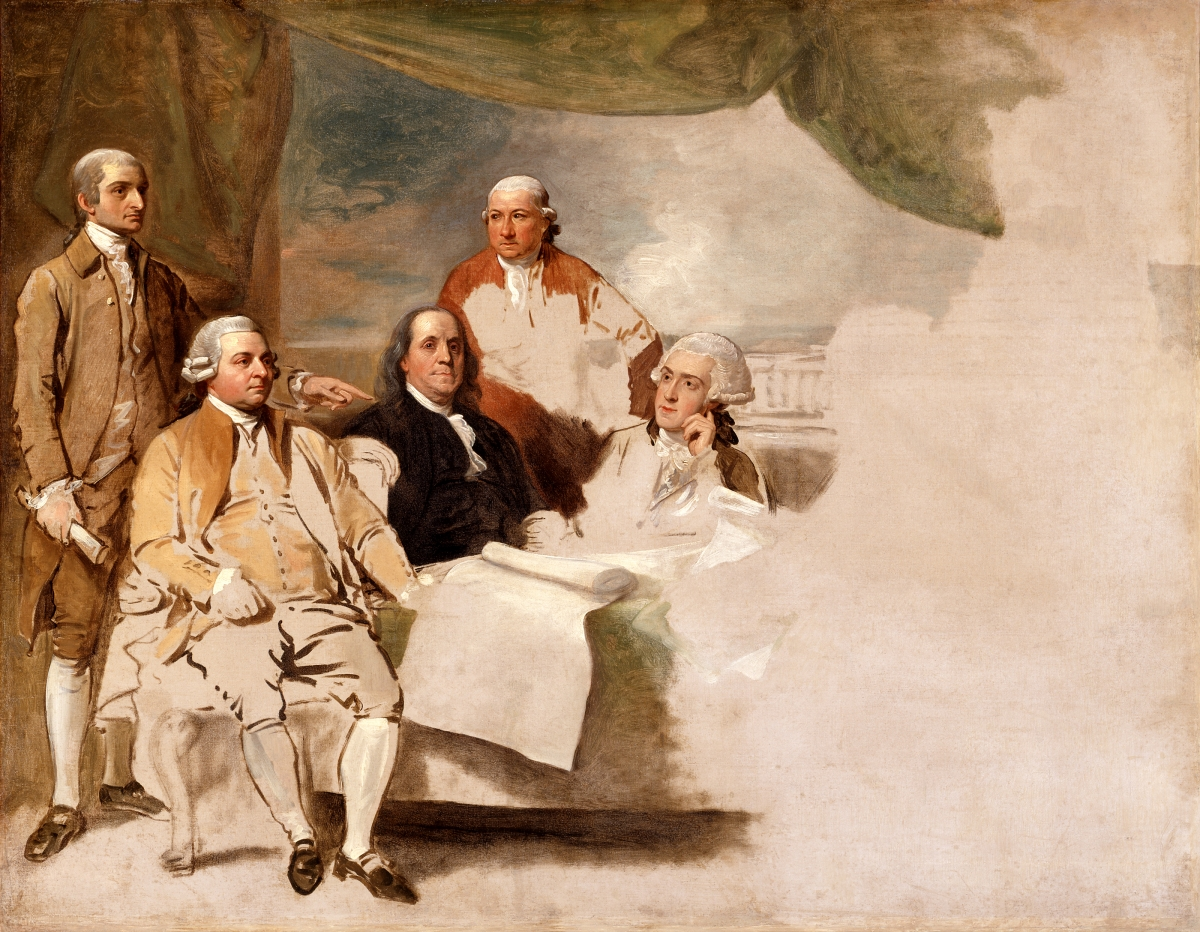
Signing of the Treaty of Paris showing only the American representatives; the British refused to sit for painting

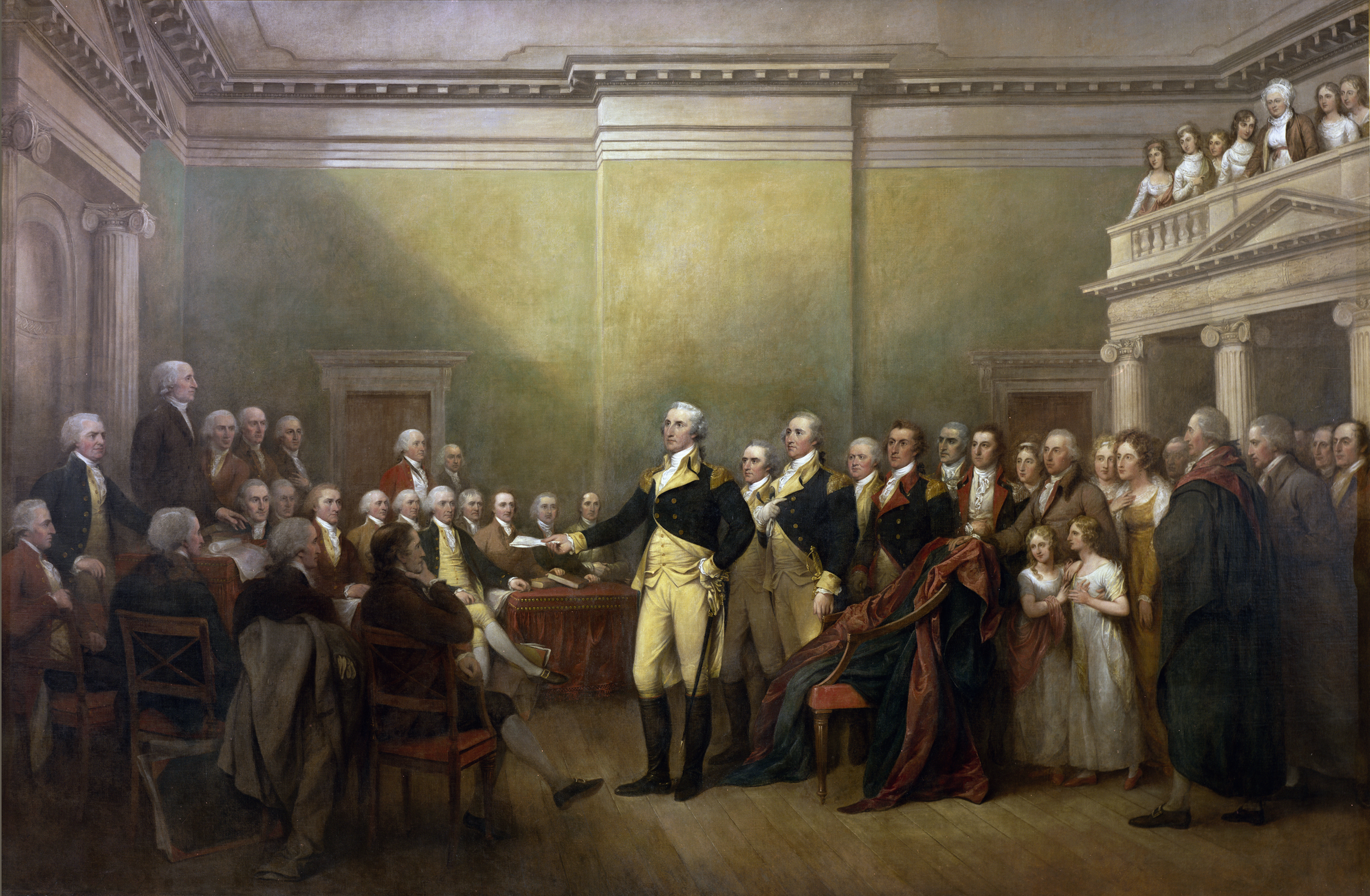
George Washington resigns as commander-in-chief of the Continental Army

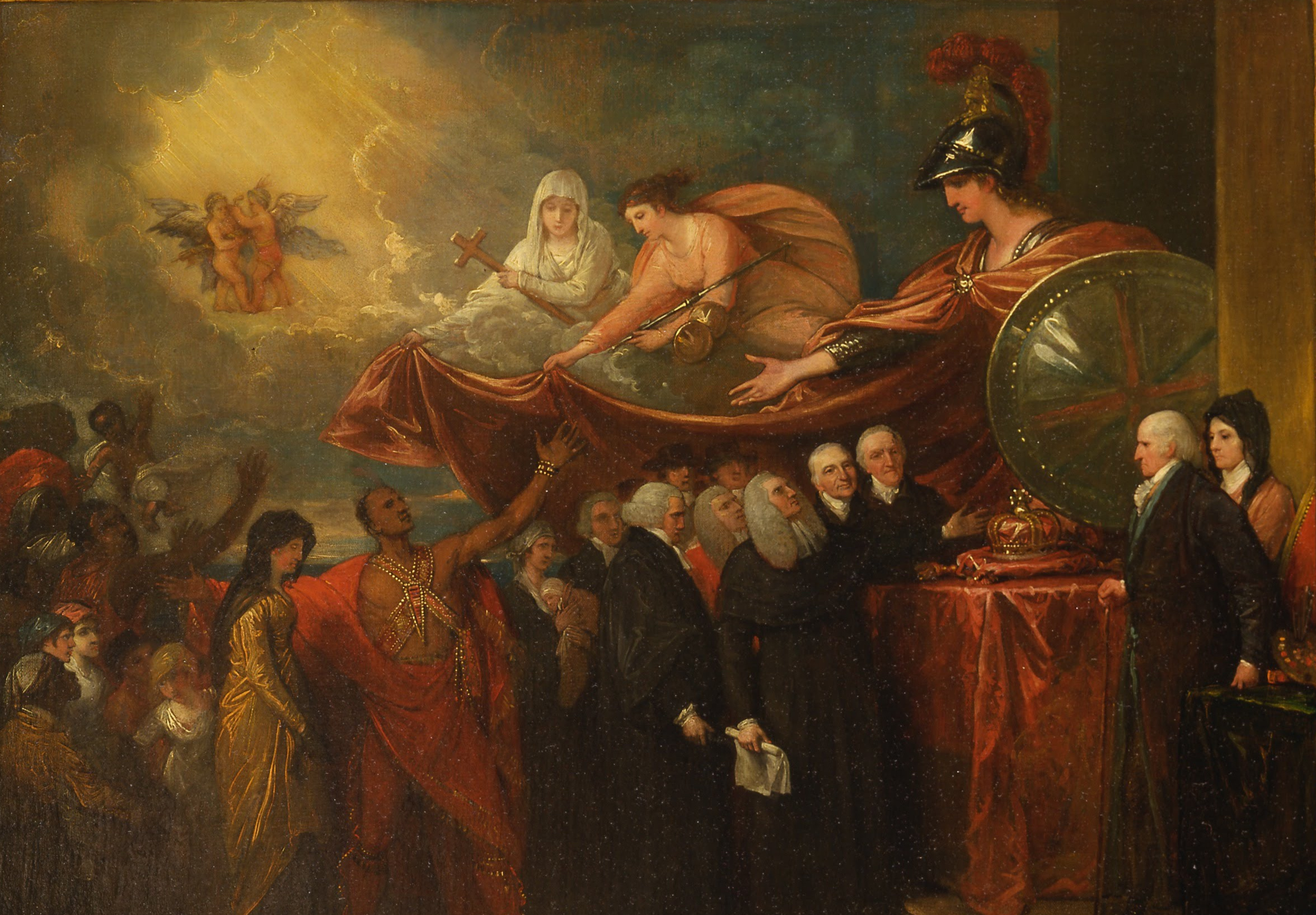
Allegorical painting of the British Empire taking in American Loyalists, 1783

- Newburgh Conspiracy (March 10–15)
- Society of the Cincinnati founded; hereditary organization of the leaders of the American Revolution (May 13)
- Pennsylvania Mutiny of 1783 (June 20–24)
- The Treaty of Paris (1783) (September 3) signed between the representatives of the United States and Great Britain, ending the American Revolutionary War; ratification in early 1784
- The British evacuate New York, marking the end of British rule.
- British loyalist refugees retreat to Quebec and Nova Scotia. General George Washington triumphantly returns with the Continental Army (November 25).
- George Washington resigns as commander-in-chief of the Continental Army and returns to civilian life at Mount Vernon. (December 23)
- Exodus of Loyalists to Britain, Nova Scotia, and elsewhere, but many remain in their home communities.

== 1784–1787 ==
=== 1784 ===
- The Treaty of Paris is ratified by the Congress (January 14)
  - Jay–Gardoqui Treaty with Spain fails to be ratified. Negotiations continued until 1786
- The Treaty of Paris is ratified by the British (April 9)
- Ratified treaties are exchanged in Paris between the two nations (May 12)
- "The State of Frankland," later known as Franklin, secedes from North Carolina (August 23)
- Robert Morris resigns as Superintendent of Finance and is not replaced (November 1)

=== 1785 ===
- Congress refuses admission of the State of Franklin to the Union (May 16)
- Treaty of Hopewell (South Carolina) signed between representatives of the Congress and the Cherokee, Choctaw, and Chickasaw peoples. The chief provision of the treaties was defining boundaries between sovereign tribal lands and lands open to white settlement. Despite affixing their signatures to the treaties, none of the Native American tribes recognized the sovereignty of the United States over their ancestral lands.

=== 1786 ===
- Shays's Rebellion (August 29 – June 1787)
- Annapolis Convention fails (September 11–14)

=== 1787 ===
- Congress approves a convention to revise the Articles of Confederation (Feb. 21)
- Northwest Ordinance enacted (July 13)

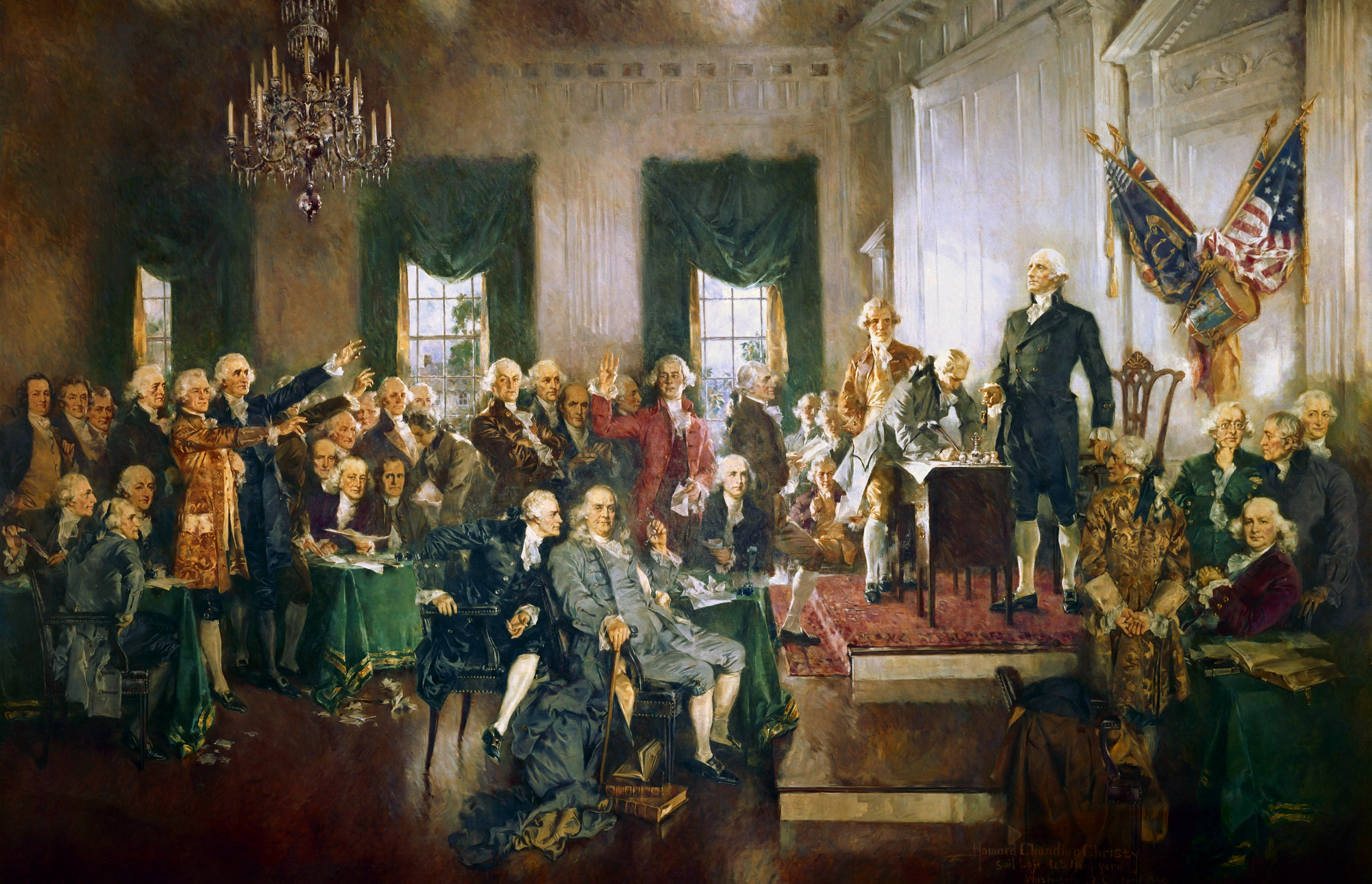
Scene at the Signing of the Constitution of the United States, by Howard Chandler Christy (1940)

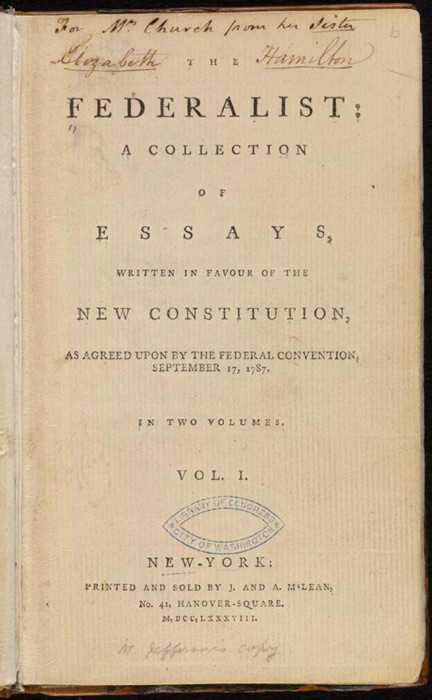
The Federalist Papers

- Constitutional Convention in Philadelphia (May 25 – September 17)
- The Federalist Papers, essays in support of a strong national government anonymously written by Alexander Hamilton, James Madison, and John Jay under the pen-name "Publius", give reasons for ratifying the Constitution (October 1787 – May 1788)
- Delaware (December 7), Pennsylvania (December 12), and New Jersey (December 18) ratify the Constitution

== 1788–1797 ==
=== 1788 ===
- Georgia ratifies the Constitution (Jan. 3@2); Connecticut (Jan. 9), Massachusetts (Feb. 6) and proposes amendments. Rhode Island rejects ratification in a referendum (March 24); Maryland ratifies (April 28); South Carolina May 23)
- New Hampshire ratifies, becoming the ninth state to do so, the new constitution can come into effect (June 21)
- United States Constitution ratified (June 21)
- Cyrus Griffin resigns as "President of the United States in Congress Assembled" (November 2), and with the exceptions of John Jay and John Knox remaining as Secretaries of Foreign Affairs and War respectively; and Michael Hillegas remaining as Treasurer, the United States of America temporarily ceases to exist.
- Congress names New York as the site of the new federal government; fixes the date of elections and meeting of the new Congress.
- The first federal elections for the House of Representatives begin
- Confederation Government accepts a cession of land from Maryland for a new capital, the Federal District of Columbia, what becomes Washington, D.C. (Dec. 23)
- 1788–89 United States presidential election (December 15, 1788 – January 10, 1789). George Washington is elected president, and John Adams is elected vice president.

=== 1789 ===
- Philip Pell, only member in attendance, adjourns the Congress of the Confederation sine die (March 2)
- Members of the 1st United States Congress begin to take their seats at Federal Hall, New York (March 4)
- House of Representatives first achieves a quorum and elects its officers (April 1)
- Senate first achieves a quorum and elects its officers (April 6)
- Joint session of Congress counts the Electoral College ballots, certifies that George Washington has been unanimously elected President of the United States (April 6)
- Adams becomes the first vice president (April 21)
- Washington inaugurated as the first president, at Federal Hall in New York City (April 30)
- The Tariff Act of 1789 is signed into law (July 4)
- Charles Thomson resigns as secretary of the Confederation Congress and hands over the Great Seal, the last act of that Congress (July)
- French Revolution begins (July)
- Henry Knox named Secretary of War (Aug. 7)
- Alexander Hamilton named Treasury Secretary (Sept. 2)
- Judiciary Act of 1789 established the federal court system. John Jay appointed the first chief justice (September 24)
- Congress approves twelve articles of amendment to the Constitution, the Bill of Rights (September 25)
- Jefferson named first Secretary of State (Sept. 26)
- North Carolina becomes the 12th state to ratify the Constitution, with a vote of 194–77 (November 21)

=== 1790 ===
- (May 29) Rhode Island becomes the 13th state to ratify the Constitution, with a vote of 34 to 32
- Treasury Secretary Alexander Hamilton's plans for funding the Federal government and assuming states' debts approved.
- Federal government moves from New York City to Philadelphia.

=== 1791 ===
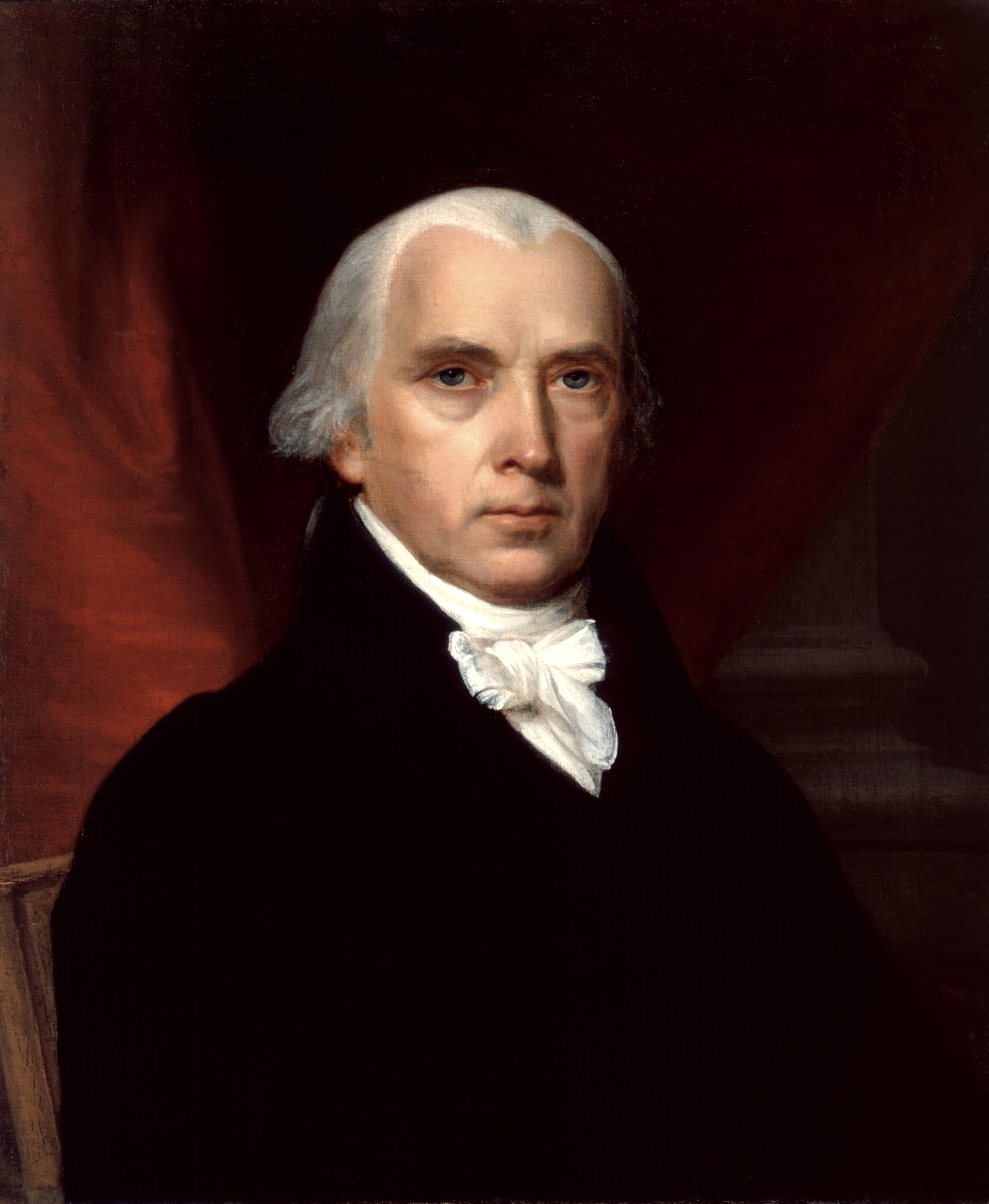
James Madison, chief author and advocate for the Bill of Rights

- Bill of Rights ratified (December 15).
- Bank of the United States chartered by Congress.
- Congress passes whiskey tax to pay off war debt; citizen resistance.
- Haitian Revolution begins.

=== 1792 ===
- 1792 United States presidential election: George Washington reelected president, John Adams reelected vice president.

=== 1793 ===
- President Washington and Vice President Adams begin their second terms (March 4).
- Napoleonic Wars break out between France and Britain.
- Neutrality Proclamation issued by Washington, leaving its alliance with France (April 22).

=== 1794 ===
- Jay Treaty, the Treaty of Amity, Commerce, and Navigation, Between His Britannic Majesty and the United States of America, between Great Britain and the U.S. averted war, resolved issues remaining since the 1783 Treaty of Paris and facilitated ten years of peaceful trade between Americans and the British in the midst of the French Revolutionary Wars, which had begun in 1792. The treaty angered the French who had been the Americans' ally in the War of American Independence.
- Whiskey Rebellion, a violent tax protest in western Pennsylvania, suppressed by the Federal government.

=== 1795 ===
- Jay's Treaty ratified in June toward resolving post Revolution tensions between the United States and Great Britain. First use of arbitration in modern diplomatic history for Canada–United States border disputes.

=== 1796 ===
- Six Northwest Territory forts and two Upstate New York forts that remained under British control are ceded to the United States.
- 1796 United States presidential election: John Adams is elected president, Thomas Jefferson elected vice president.

=== 1797 ===
- Adams becomes the second president, Jefferson becomes the second vice president (March 4).

=== 1798 ===
- Irish Rebellion of 1798 (May 24 – October 12). Uprising by Irish nationalists against the British government.

=== 1800 ===
- 1800 United States presidential election: Thomas Jefferson elected third President.

== See also ==
- List of American Revolutionary War battles
- List of George Washington articles
- Territorial evolution of the British Empire
- Timeline of Colonial America
- Timeline of Canadian history
