= Edward "Ned" Kendall =

- Kendall, c. 1850
- Born: March 1, 1808; Fort Wolcott, Goat Island, Rhode Island, U.S.
- Died: October 26, 1861 (aged 53); Boston, Massachusetts, U.S.
- Occupation(s): Bandleader, musician

Edward "Ned" Kendall (March 1, 1808 in Fort Wolcott, Goat Island, Rhode Island – October 26, 1861 in Boston) was a bandleader and musician who played the keyed bugle. He was known for his Boston Brass Band, itself a pioneer in all-brass bands, and for a trumpet-playing showdown with the former leader of the Boston Brigade Band, Patrick Gilmore. He was also known for his silver bugle, a gift from Queen Victoria.

Kendall formed or took leadership of the Boston Brass Band in 1835, at a time when band instruments were changing. He played the keyed bugle, an instrument first made by Nathan Adams of Lowell, Massachusetts, c. 1825. The instruments had become popular with bands very soon, and were common by 1830. Ned was considered among the best on his chosen instrument, and his death seen as the "end of an era" for the instrument, as the valved cornet took over in the bands.

One of Kendall's instruments, a keyed bugle made H. Sibley, Boston, was given to the Library of Congress.
