= Fort Wolcott =

Fort on Goat Island, Rhode Island

- Goat Island, Rhode Island

Site information
- Controlled by: Kingdom of England; Kingdom of Great Britain; United States

Location
- Rhode Island
- Coordinates: 41.4852°N 71.3280°W

Site history
- Built: c. 1702
- In use: 1702-1960s
- Events: Attacks on HMS St John and HMS Liberty

Fort Wolcott was a fortification on the small Goat Island in Newport Harbor of Narragansett Bay less than 1 mile west of the city of Newport, Rhode Island. The attacks on HMS St John and HMS Liberty occurred near the fort.

== Fort Anne ==
An earthen Fort Anne, built on Goat Island in 1702 or 1703 during the War of Spanish Succession, taking the name of Anne, Queen of Great Britain. The fort with 12 guns lasted until 1724.

== Fort George ==
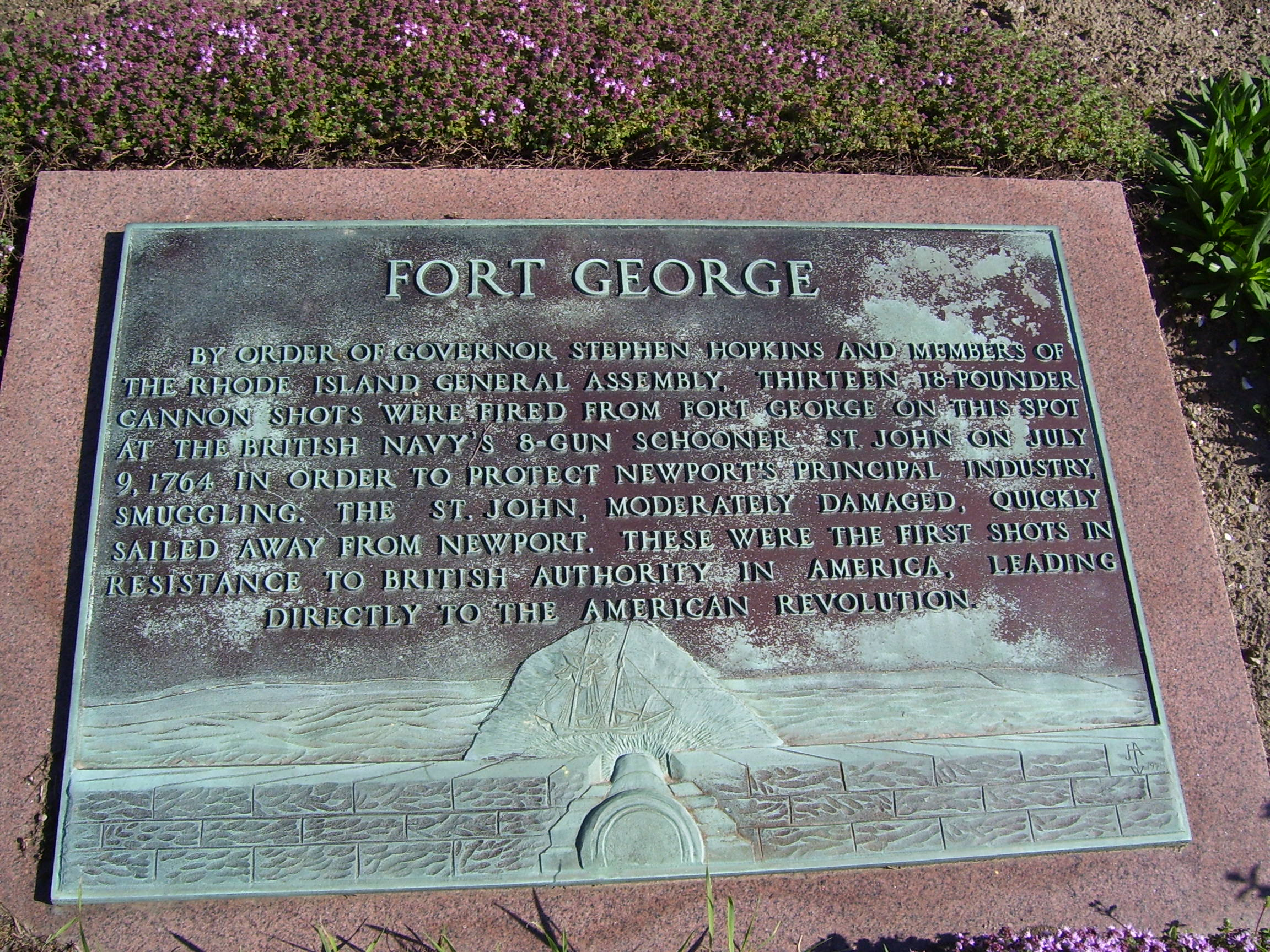
Fort George plaque on Goat Island

In 1730, the fort returned to service under a new name, Fort George after King George II of Great Britain. In 1738, defenders of Rhode Island built a stone fortification on the site with perhaps fifty guns.

In 1764, residents of Newport, Rhode Island, took over Fort George and fired shots at HMS St John under orders from the governor of Rhode Island and the General Assembly. In another early act of rebellion against British rule, Rhode Islanders in 1769 burned the British customs ship Liberty when it drifted to the north end of Goat Island.

== Fort Liberty ==
With the outbreak of the American Revolution in 1775, the fort was renamed as Fort Liberty. In 1776, American patriots armed Fort Liberty with 25 guns and built various breastworks to defend the City of Newport. In December 1776 the British army occupied Newport without resistance and renamed the fort "Fort George." The British left Newport in November 1779. The French army under Count de Rochambeau occupied Newport in 1780 and used the fort as part of their defenses until their departure in 1781.

== Fort Washington ==
In 1784, Rhode Islanders repaired the fort, renamed it Fort Washington after General George Washington, and armed it with 28 guns. In 1794, the City of Newport sold Goat Island to the federal government for $1,500 to maintain a fort to defend Newport Harbor. Control of Fort Washington passed from the Rhode Island state militia to United States Army artillery and engineering companies. The Army rebuilt Fort Washington and outfitted it with 38 guns. The first United States Army officer to command the fort was Captain William Littlefield, a native of Newport who had served during the American Revolution. Captain Littlefield assumed his duties in either June or July 1794 which marked the beginning of a presence of the United States Armed Forces in Newport which continues to this day. (Only West Point, New York can claim a longer continuous presence of the US Armed Forces.)

== Fort Wolcott ==
The Army rebuilt the fort again in 1798 as part of the first system of Seacoast defense in the United States and renamed it Fort Wolcott, commemorating the services of the late Oliver Wolcott, a general of the Connecticut militia, a member of the Continental Congress and a signer of the Declaration of Independence.

The Army assigned Captain John Henry, who was instrumental in starting the War of 1812, to Fort Wolcott in the late 1790s. From 1798 to 1800, the American government rebuilt the earthworks of the fort. After 1802 Fort Wolcott was the primary fort defending Newport harbor along with the smaller Fort Adams, which was activated in 1799. The Army repaired Fort Wolcott in 1808. Secretary of War William Eustis on 19 December 1809 (American State Papers, Volume 016, page 245.) records 12 guns mounted within Fort Wolcott and 18 more guns mounted on the flank batteries to the north and south of the fort. The Secretary of War's report on fortifications for December 1811 describes Fort Wolcott as "a small enclosed work, with open batteries, extending from two opposite flanks, of stone, earth, sods, &c. mounting thirty-eight heavy guns... The barracks are of bricks and wood, for one company...".

By the time of the War of 1812, Fort Wolcott along with other fortifications at Fort Adams (on nearby Brenton Point), Fort Greene (in the Point Section of Newport), Fort Hamilton (on Rose Island, North Battery (location uncertain), Fort Dumpling (on Conanicut Island), and Tonomy Hill defended Newport harbor and strategically important Narragansett Bay. Fort Wolcott, built of stone cemented with lime, featured a brick-and-stone magazine, sally-port, ditch, furnace, and bomb-proof brick barracks. Armament included five long-range 32-pounder guns.

President James Monroe visited the garrison on 28 June 1817 and left with a positive impression. By 1818, Fort Wolcott featured 28 guns. After 1821, Fort Wolcott absorbed troops from the other forts in Rhode Island and hosted the only continuous army garrison in the state. Meteorological observations began by 1822. In 1823 or 1824, the first Newport Harbor Lighthouse was built at the north end of Goat Island.

== Decommissioning ==
The Army transferred the garrison from Fort Wolcott on 22 May 1836 to fight in the First Seminole War. This left Rhode Island without an active coast defense fort until the opening of the new Fort Adams in 1841.

The United States Government built the present Goat Island Lighthouse at the northern tip of this island in 1842 to replace the old lighthouse which had been moved to Prudence Island.

Goat Island hosted the training ship squadron of United States Naval Academy during the American Civil War. The War Department still stationed an ordnance sergeant at the fort to maintain its artillery pieces as late as the 1870s.

== Naval activities ==
In 1869, the United States Navy founded a United States Naval Torpedo Station on the site of the former Fort Wolcott. This naval facility greatly expanded during the succeeding century, and the Navy Torpedo Factory on Goat Island produced many torpedoes for the Navy through World War I and World War II. The Navy nevertheless closed the torpedo station in 1951 and created Naval Undersea Warfare Center at the nearby Newport Navy base.

== United States Coast Guard ==
In addition to the Goat Island lighthouse, the United States Coast Guard has maintained a cutter at Goat Island since at least the late 1960s. The Point-class cutter USCGC Point Turner served her entire 31-year career at Goat Island from when she was commissioned on 14 April 1967 until she was decommissioned on 3 April 1998. The tradition of having a Coast Guard cutter stationed at Goat Island resumed when the Marine Protector-class patrol boat USCGC Tiger Shark was commissioned on 16 July 2005. Tiger Shark was based at Goat Island until about 2013 when its berth was moved to Pier 2 at the Naval Station Newport.

== Privatization ==
In the 1960s, the federal government sold the majority of Goat Island to a private developer, Globe Manufacturing. The developer demolished most buildings from the old fortifications. Over the next several decades, Globe constructed a hotel and condominiums and converted the only former navy building remaining on the island into a marina.

== See also ==
- Seacoast defense in the United States
