= HMS St John (1764) =

Schooner of the Royal Navy

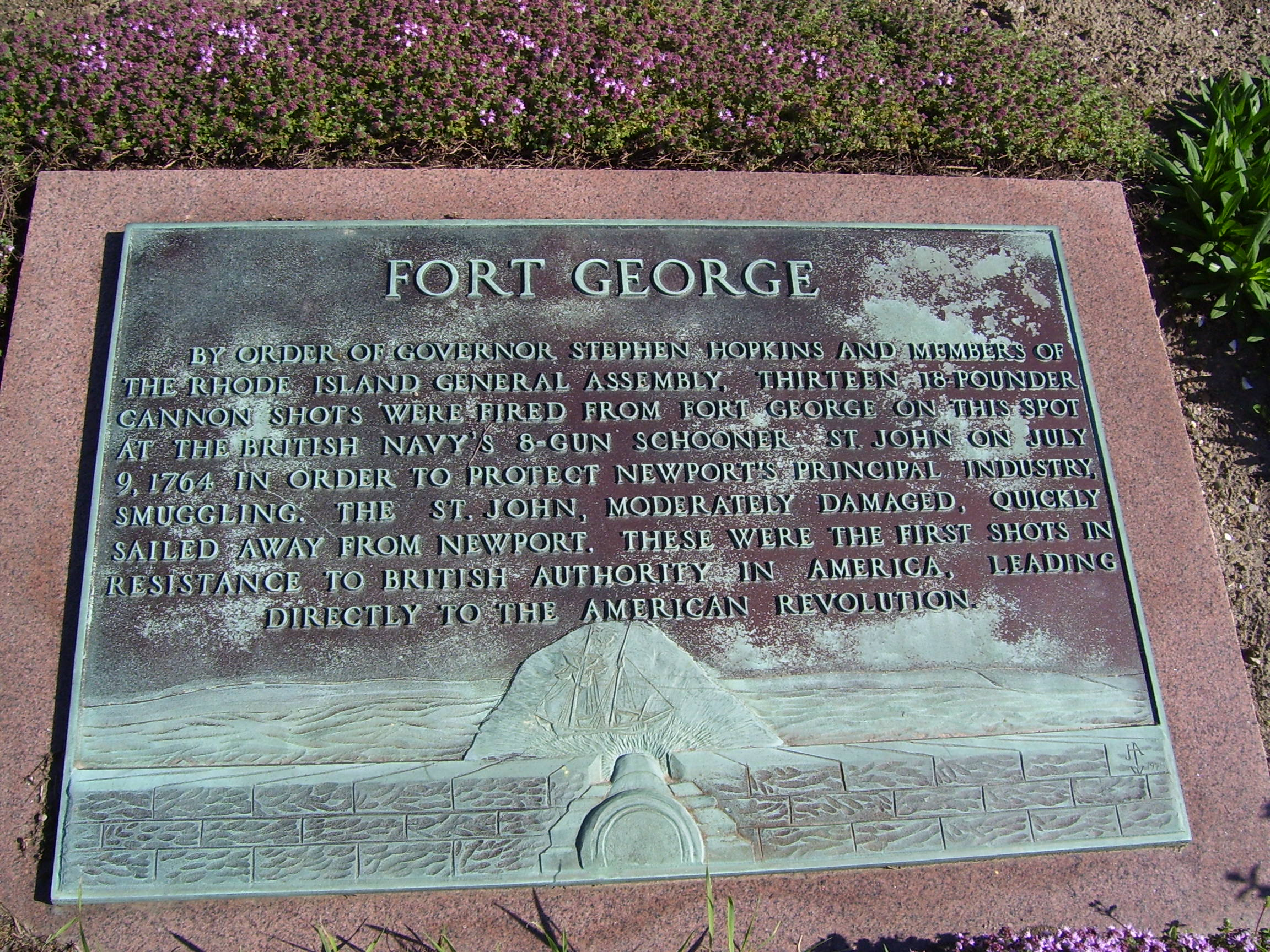
A plaque in Fort Wolcott on Goat Island commemorating the attack on St John

HMS St John was a 8-gun schooner of the Royal Navy best known for her involvement in the American Revolution, when she was attacked by colonists in Newport, Rhode Island intent on protecting their involvement in smuggling.

== History ==
In 1764, the Parliament of Great Britain passed the Sugar Act, which was negatively received in British North America, in particular the colony of Rhode Island and Providence Plantations, as Rhode Island's primary industry consisting of producing rum from molasses. To enforce the act, several Royal Navy warships were sent to the region, including the 8-gun schooner HMS St John and the 20-gun post ship HMS Squirrel. On 6 July of that year, St John was lying at anchor off Newport, Rhode Island as part of operations aimed at suppressing smuggling by local merchants.

In response, on the orders of Governor Stephen Hopkins and members of the Rhode Island General Assembly, a group of local residents took over Fort George on Goat Island and fired at St John. Thirteen shots from the fort's 18-pounder long guns were fired at her, though she managed to escape with minor damage; this marked one of the first violent confrontations of the American Revolution. Those involved at firing at St John left Fort George before Squirrel arrived on the scene. St John was subsequently involved in moving stocks of gunpowder away from Nassau, Bahamas on 4 March 1776 during the raid of Nassau by the Continental Marines.

== See also ==
- HMS Liberty
- Gaspee Affair
