= Prudence Island Light =

Prudence Island Light Prudence Island Light
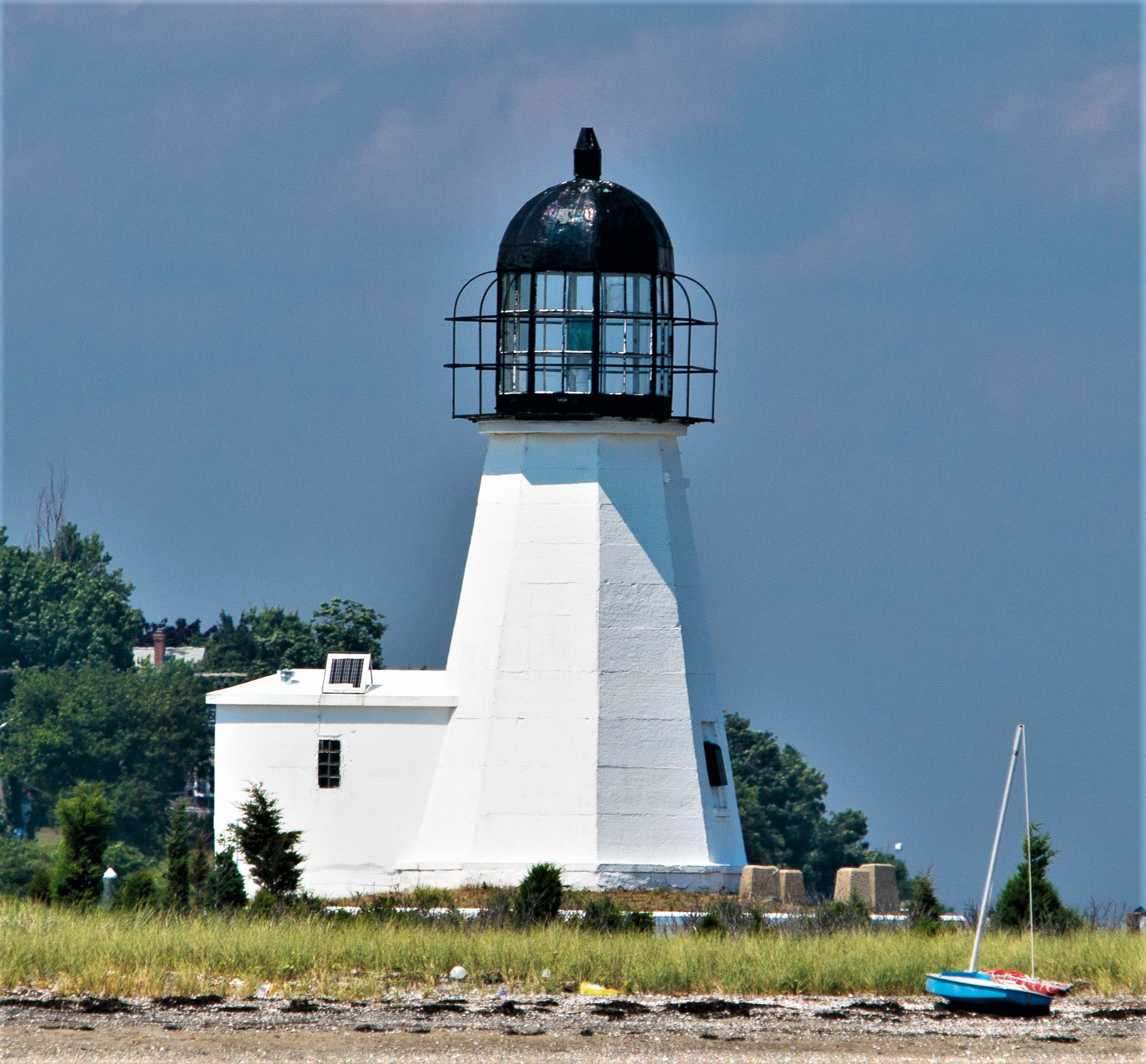
- Location: Portsmouth, Rhode Island
- Coordinates: 41°36′21.1″N 71°18′12.7″W

Tower
- Constructed: 1852
- Foundation: Natural / emplaced
- Construction: Granite blocks
- Height: 8.5 m (28 ft)
- Shape: Octagonal tower
- Markings: White
- Heritage: National Register of Historic Places listed place
- Fog signal: None

Light
- First lit: 1823 on Goat Island moved here in 1851
- Focal height: 28 feet (8.5 m)
- Lens: 5th order Fresnel lens (1852), 9.8 inches (250 mm) (current)
- Range: 6 nautical miles (11 km; 6.9 mi)
- Characteristic: Flashing green, 6 seconds
- Prudence Island Lighthouse
- U.S. National Register of Historic Places
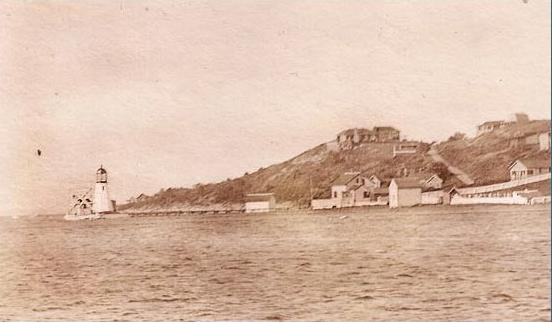
- Architect: H. Vaugh, I.N. Stanley & Brother
- MPS: Lighthouses of Rhode Island TR
- NRHP reference No.: 88000270
- Added to NRHP: March 30, 1988

The Prudence Island Lighthouse, more commonly known locally as the Sandy Point Lighthouse, is located on Prudence Island, Rhode Island and is the oldest lighthouse tower in the state. Sandy Point is nicknamed Chibacoweda, meaning "little place separated by a passage", because the location is a little more than one mile offshore.

== History ==
The lighthouse was constructed in 1823 and originally sat on a dike off Goat Island farther south in the Bay, where the Newport Harbor Light stands today. In 1851, it was transported to Prudence Island where it remains. It is one of the few lighthouses in the United States to retain its original bird-cage lantern. The light was listed on the National Register of Historic Places in 1988.

=== 1938 New England hurricane ===
The lighthouse keeper's house was swept away in the 1938 New England hurricane, and five people were washed out to sea and drowned:

1. the keeper's wife, Mrs. George T. Gustavus (née Mable Gertrude Norwood; 1888–1938),
2. the keeper's son, Edward J. Gustavus (1926–1938),
3. the former keeper, Martin Thompson (1868–1938),
4. James George Lynch (1863–1938) and v, his wife, Ellen Lynch (née Ellen Wyatt; 1870–1938) – both of whom had sought refuge at the lighthouse residence.

The lighthouse keeper, George Theodore Gustavus (1884–1976), was also swept into the sea, but was swept back ashore and survived.

== See also ==
- National Register of Historic Places listings in Newport County, Rhode Island
