= Daniel Malcolm =

- Born: Daniel Malcolm c. 1725; Boston, Massachusetts Colony
- Died: October 23, 1769 (aged 44); Boston, Massachusetts Colony
- Burial place: Copp's Hill Burying Ground, Boston
- Espionage activity
- Allegiance: United States

Captain Daniel Malcolm (c. 1725 – October 23, 1769) was an American merchant, sea captain, and smuggler. Malcolm was known for resisting the British authorities in the years leading up to the American Revolutionary War. He was the brother of John Malcolm, a minor British customs officer who was violently tarred and feathered by a Boston mob.

When the Townshend Acts were passed, Malcolm instigated a boycott on British imports. He led a group of Boston merchants to stop importing products for a year in 1769. He was particularly noted for smuggling sixty casks of wine without paying any dues. When British customs men showed up to confiscate the contraband stowed in his cellar, he refused. Malcolm was able to muster four hundred men and boys to block British reinforcements. This episode is said to have contributed to the Liberty Affair involving John Hancock. Malcolm publicized the illegal seizure of a vessel owned by Hancock, who was also a known smuggler. It is said that he took risk in providing this eyewitness account, which was published in the Boston Chronicle's January 9, 1769, issue. The Liberty Affair led to a riot that was one of the main factors in the British government's decision to send troops to Boston, a move that would culminate in the Boston Massacre on March 5, 1770.

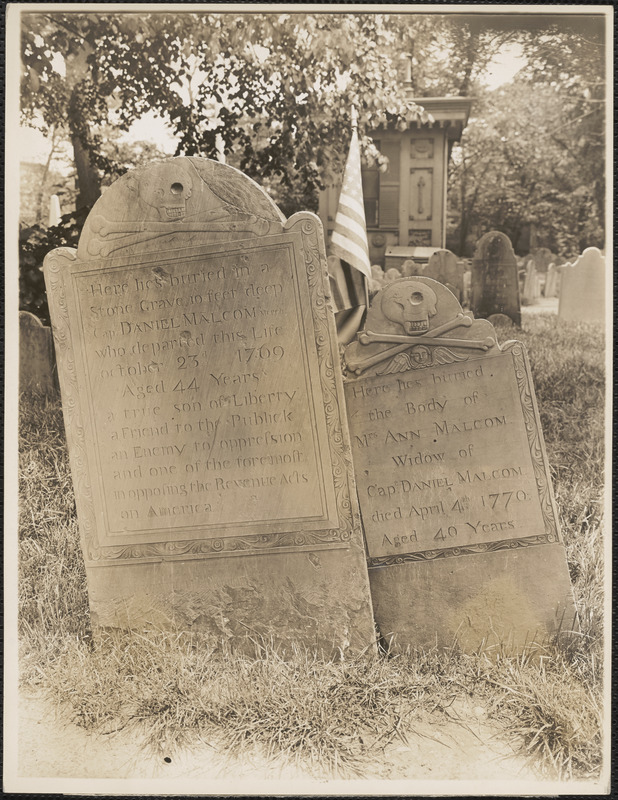
Capt. Daniel Malcolm, Copp's Hill Burying Ground, Boston, Mass., ca. 1920–1960. Leon Abdalian Collection, Boston Public Library

Malcolm died on October 23, 1769, and was buried in Boston's Copp's Hill Burying Ground. He is said to have asked to be buried in the location, ten feet deep "safe from British bullets". His body was left alone but his tombstone was singled out for target practice by the Red Coats.
