= Goat Island (Rhode Island) =

Small island in Rhode Island, U.S.

Native name: Nante Sinunk
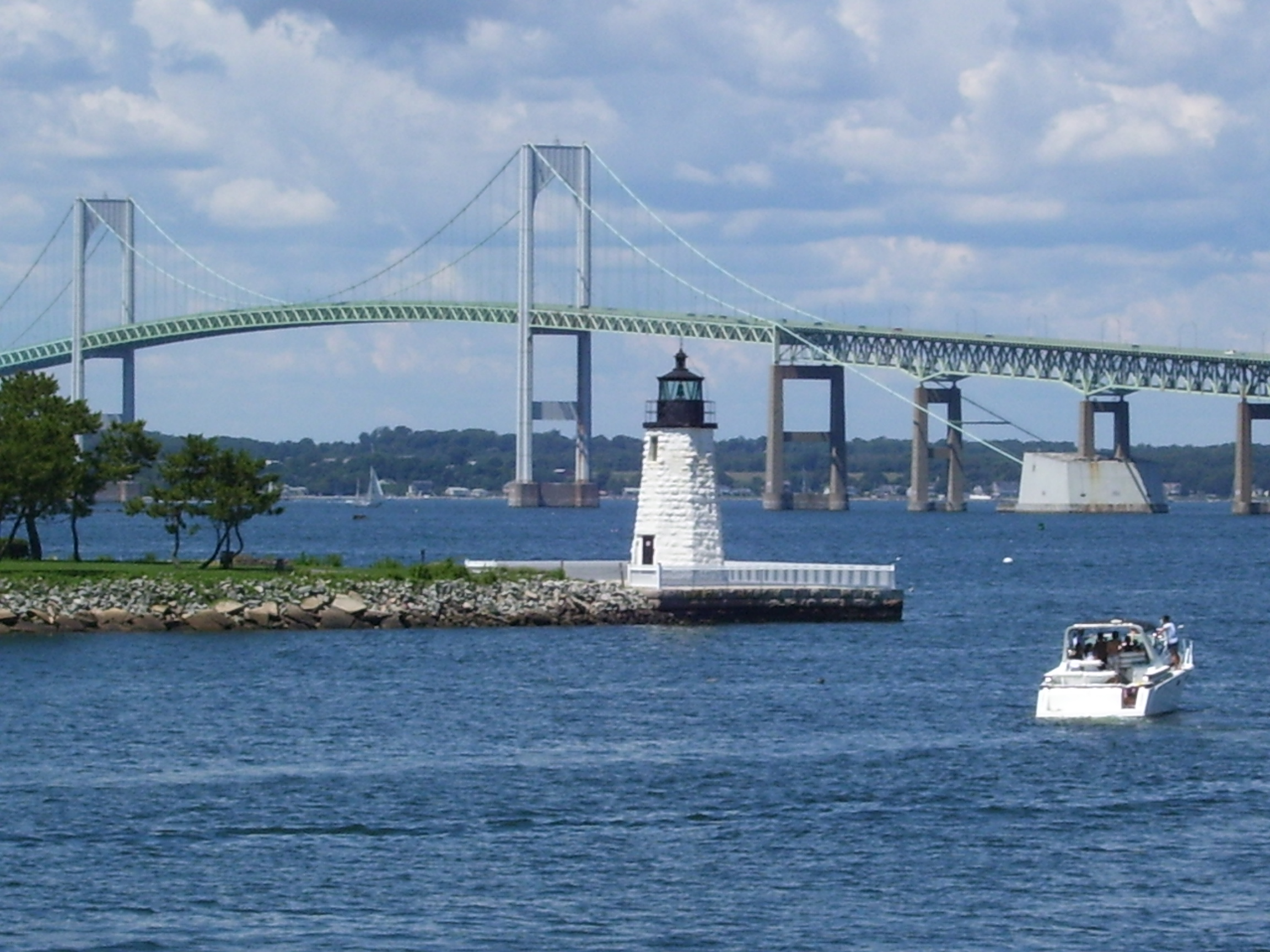
- Newport Harbor Light (1842) on northern tip of Goat Island as seen from The Point. The Claiborne Pell Bridge can be seen in the background.
- Interactive map of Goat Island

Geography
- Coordinates: 41°29.112′N 71°19.681′W

Administration
- United States
- State: Rhode Island
- City: Newport

Goat Island is a small island in Narragansett Bay and is part of the city of Newport, Rhode Island, U.S. The island is connected to the Easton's Point neighborhood via a causeway bridge. It is home to the Newport Harbor Light (1842), residences, a restaurant, event space, and hotel. It was also home to several military forts and to the U.S. Naval Torpedo Station, and was the site of the attacks on HMS St John and HMS Liberty.

== Colonial History ==
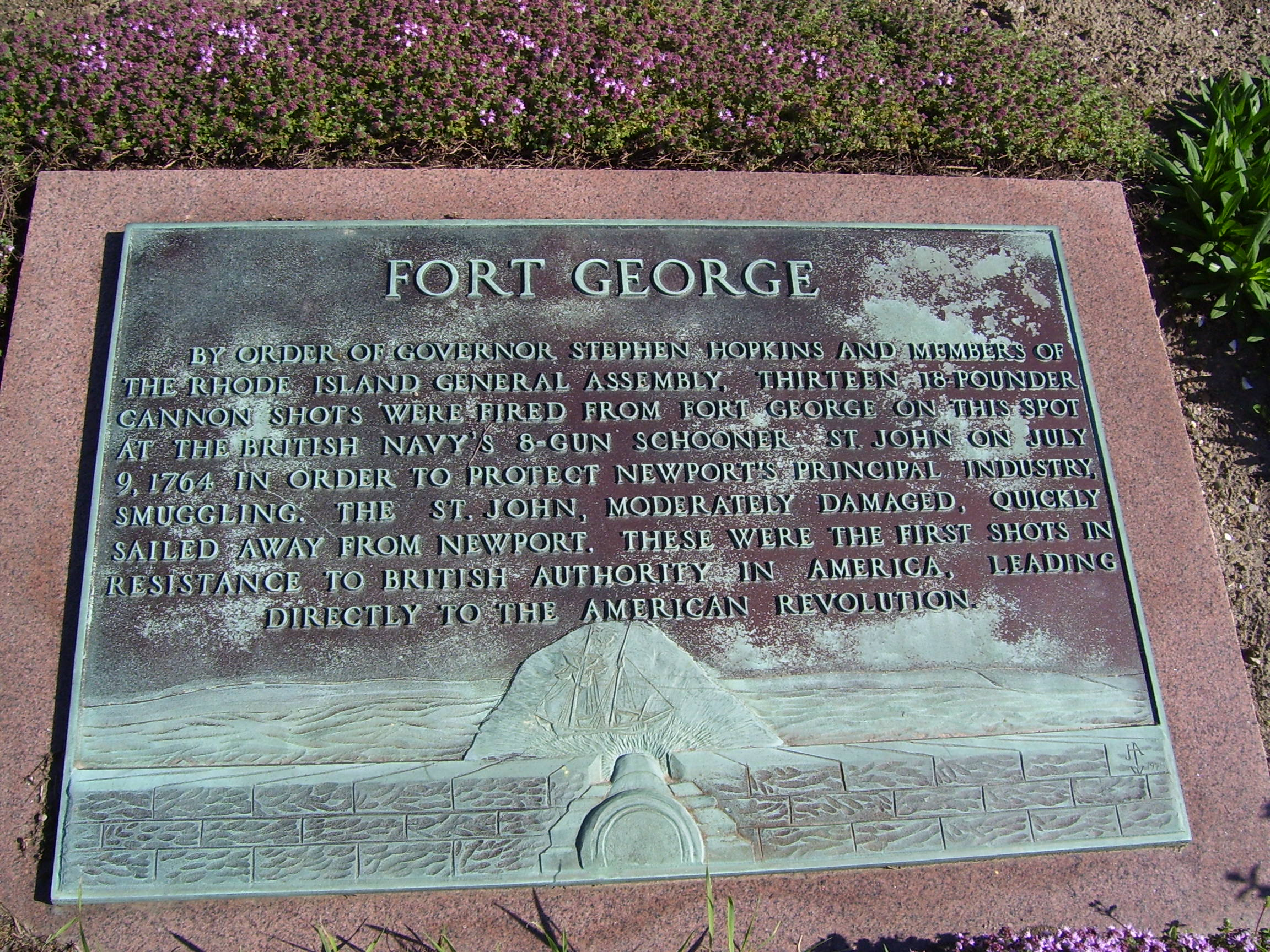
Fort George plaque on Goat Island

Narragansett Indians called the island "Nante Sinunk" and sold it in 1658. Early Newport colonists used the island as a goat pasture. The island's name has also been attributed to early colonists' discovery of a breed of goats nicknamed the New American Goat. An earthen fort was built on Goat Island in 1703 during the War of Spanish Succession, and it was named "Fort Anne" after the reigning Queen Anne.

On Friday, July 19, 1723, twenty-six pirates were buried on the north end of Goat Island, on the shore, between high and low water mark. The significance of this placement is that, to Christians of this era, this inter-tidal land was considered "unhallowed ground," like burials placed outside of a consecrated cemetery. The men had been tried in Newport between July 10 and 12 and hanged at nearby Bull's Point (Gravelly Point). They were: Charles Harris, Thomas Linicar, Daniel Hyde, Stephen Mundon, Abraham Lacy, Edward Lawson, John Tomkins, Francis Laughton, John Fisgerald, William Studfield, Owen Rice, William Read, John Bright, Thomas Hazel, William Blades (Rhode Island), Thomas Hagget, Peter Cues, William Jones, Edward Eaton, John Brown, James Sprinkly, Joseph Sound, Charles Church, John Waters, Thomas Powell (Connecticut), and Joseph Libbey. "The pirates were all young men, most of them natives of England." The following is taken from The Salem Observer, November 11, 1843: "...this was the most extensive execution of pirates that ever took place at one time in the Colonies, it was attended by a vast multitude from every part of New England."

In 1738, a stone fort was built and renamed Fort George after King George II. In 1764, Newporters took over Fort George and fired shots at HMS St. John, a Royal Navy schooner, under orders from the governor of Rhode Island and the General Assembly. In 1769, Rhode Islanders burned the customs ship HMS Liberty when it drifted to the north end of Goat Island (near where the pirates were buried) in another early act of rebellion against British rule.

In September 2018 maritime archaeologists reported that they had discovered the resting place of Captain Cook's HMS Endeavour just off the coast of Goat Island, where it had been used to blockade the Americans during the American Revolutionary War. The ship and its crew had been made famous as the first European explorers to visit Australia's east coast.

== Revolutionary War ==
In 1775, the Fort was renamed Fort Liberty. The British army occupied Newport from 1776 through 1779 and renamed it Fort George during that time.

== Post-revolution ==
In 1784 the fort on Goat Island was repaired and renamed Fort Washington after George Washington. In 1794, Newport sold Goat Island to the federal government for $1,500 to maintain a military fort to defend Newport Harbor. The fort was named Fort Wolcott in commemoration of the services of Oliver Wolcott who was a General of the Militia and a member of the Continental Congress from Connecticut. In 1824, the first Newport Harbor Lighthouse was constructed at the north end of the island. Fort Wolcott was active until 1835 when the garrison was transferred to Florida to fight the Seminole Indians.

In 1851 the original lighthouse moved to Prudence Island to become Prudence Island Light, and the current Newport Harbor Light was constructed on a dike near the former lighthouse site. The area surrounding the dike was later filled in when the hotel was constructed much later.

== Naval Torpedo Station ==
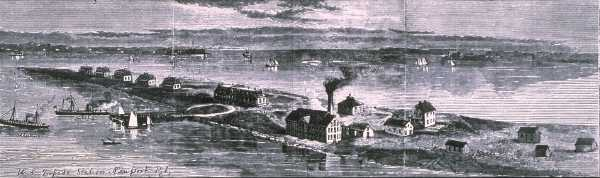
C. 1900, picture of U.S. Torpedo Station on Goat Island

In 1869 the U.S. Naval Torpedo Station was founded on Goat Island, on the site of the former Army fort. The Station was greatly expanded over the next 100 years and produced many of the Navy's torpedoes through World War I and World War II at the island's Navy Torpedo Factory. One of the Navy's first radio stations was established on the island in 1903. The torpedo station was closed in 1951 and Naval Undersea Warfare Center was created with a facility nearby.

== Coast Guard ==
In addition to the Goat Island lighthouse, the Coast Guard has maintained a cutter at Goat Island since at least the late 1960s. The Point-class cutter USCGC Point Turner (WPB-82365) served her entire 31-year career at Goat Island from when she was commissioned on April 14, 1967, until she was decommissioned on April 3, 1998. The tradition of having a Coast Guard cutter stationed at Goat Island resumed when the Marine Protector-class coastal patrol boat USCGC Tiger Shark (WPB-87359) was commissioned on July 16, 2005.

== Redevelopment ==
In the 1960s, Goat Island was sold to a private developer, Globe Manufacturing. Over the next several decades, Globe constructed the Colonial Hilton Hotel (later known as the Sheraton Islander Inn, Islander Doubletree Hotel, the Hyatt Regency, and, as of late, Newport Harbor Island Resort) and Goat Island South Condominiums, and converted the only former navy building remaining on the island into the Goat Island Marina and Marina Bar & Grille. In the 1990s Island Development Corp. (IDC) constructed the "Regatta Club", an event venue. After two Rhode Island Supreme Court decisions regarding the development, Goat Island South Condominiums took possession of the Regatta Club, leasing it to a third party. In 2006, Longwood Venues and Destinations opened Belle Mer, an event space for private functions, spanning 7.5 acres.

Images of Goat Island
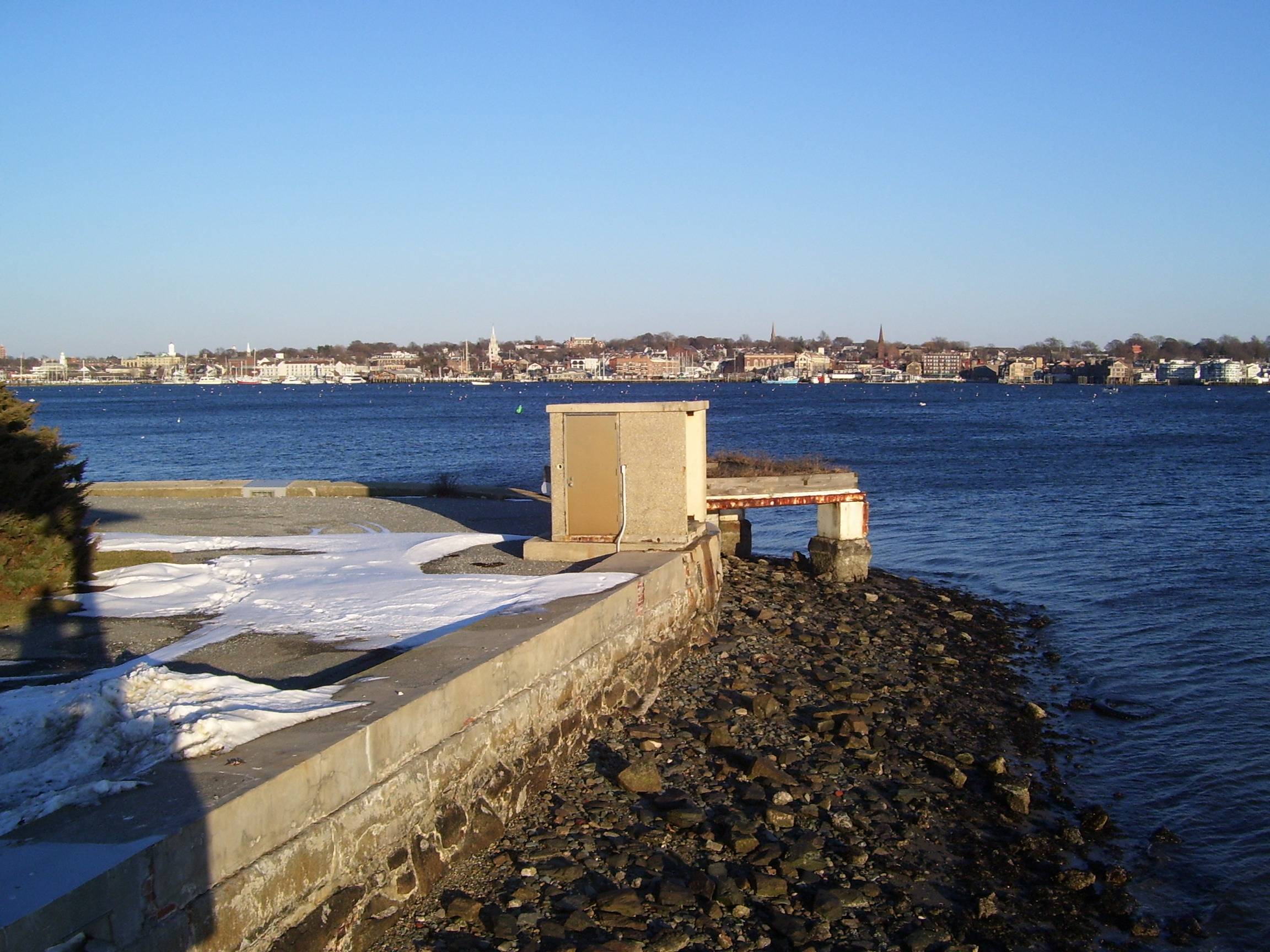
Fog horn on Goat Island

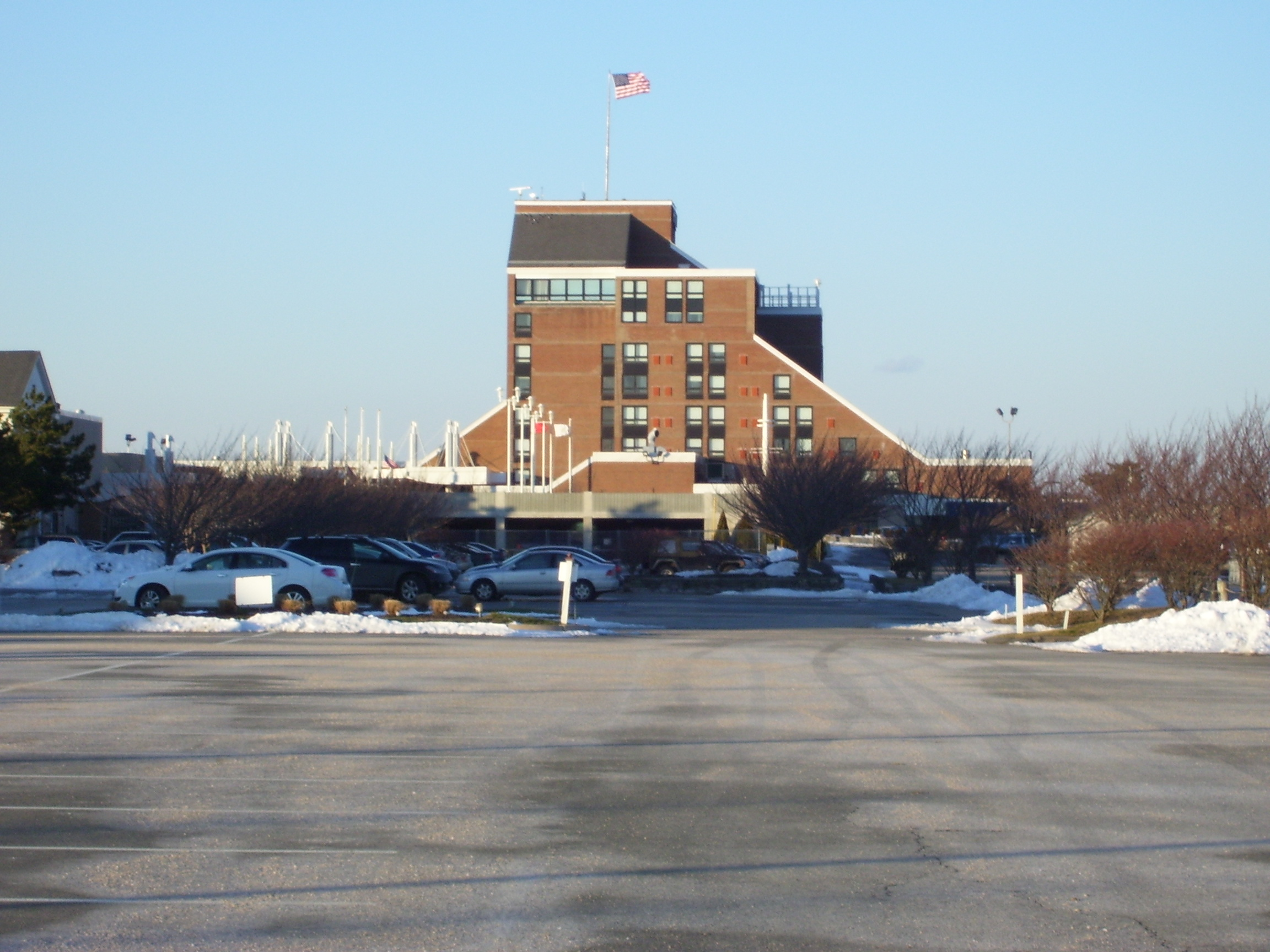
Hyatt Hotel on Goat Island. Gurney's took over the property in 2016.

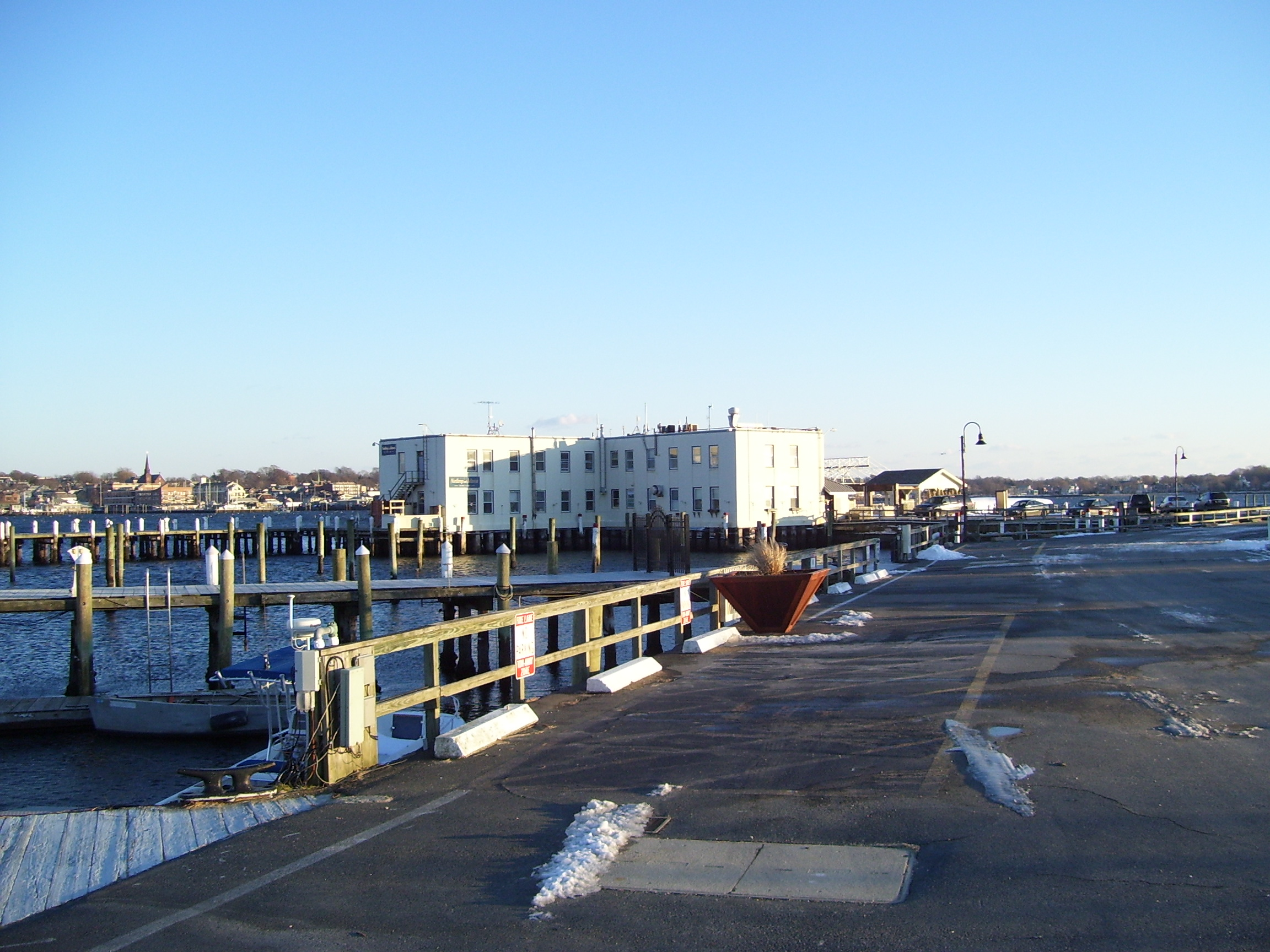
Marina Bar and Grille is located in the only U.S. Navy building remaining on Goat Island

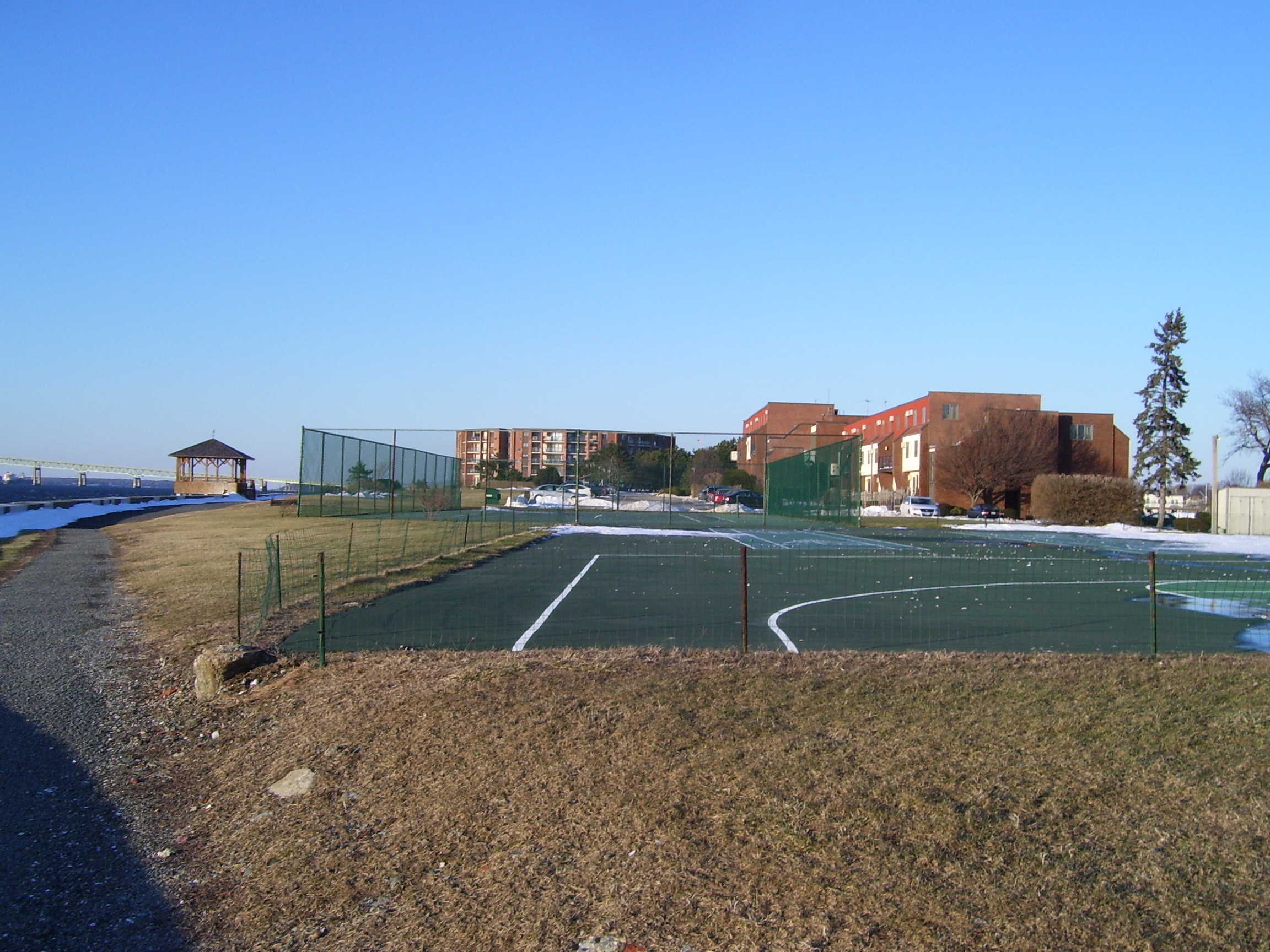
Condos on Goat Island, built in 1978 and 1979

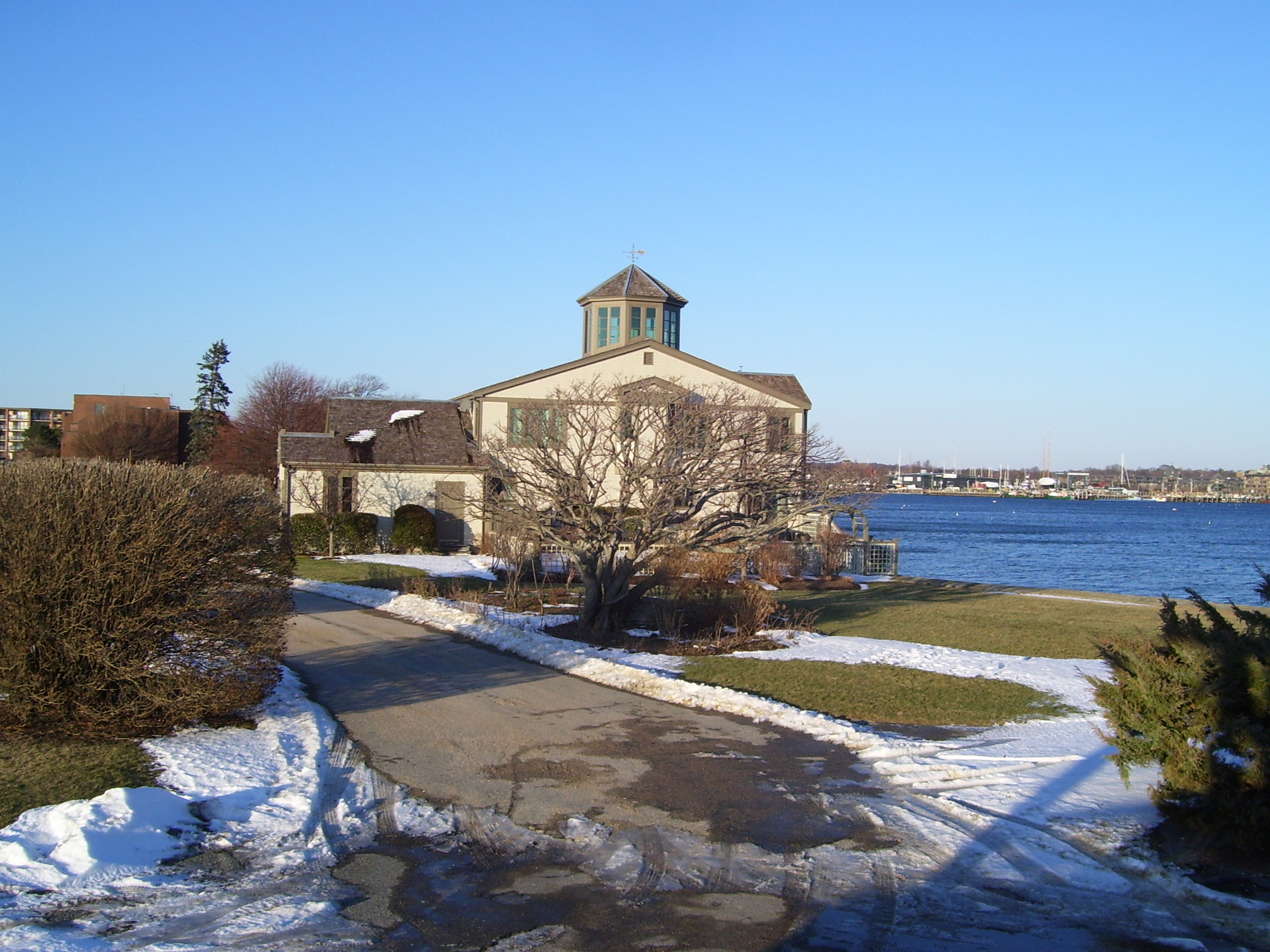
Former home of Thomas Rodgers on Goat Island

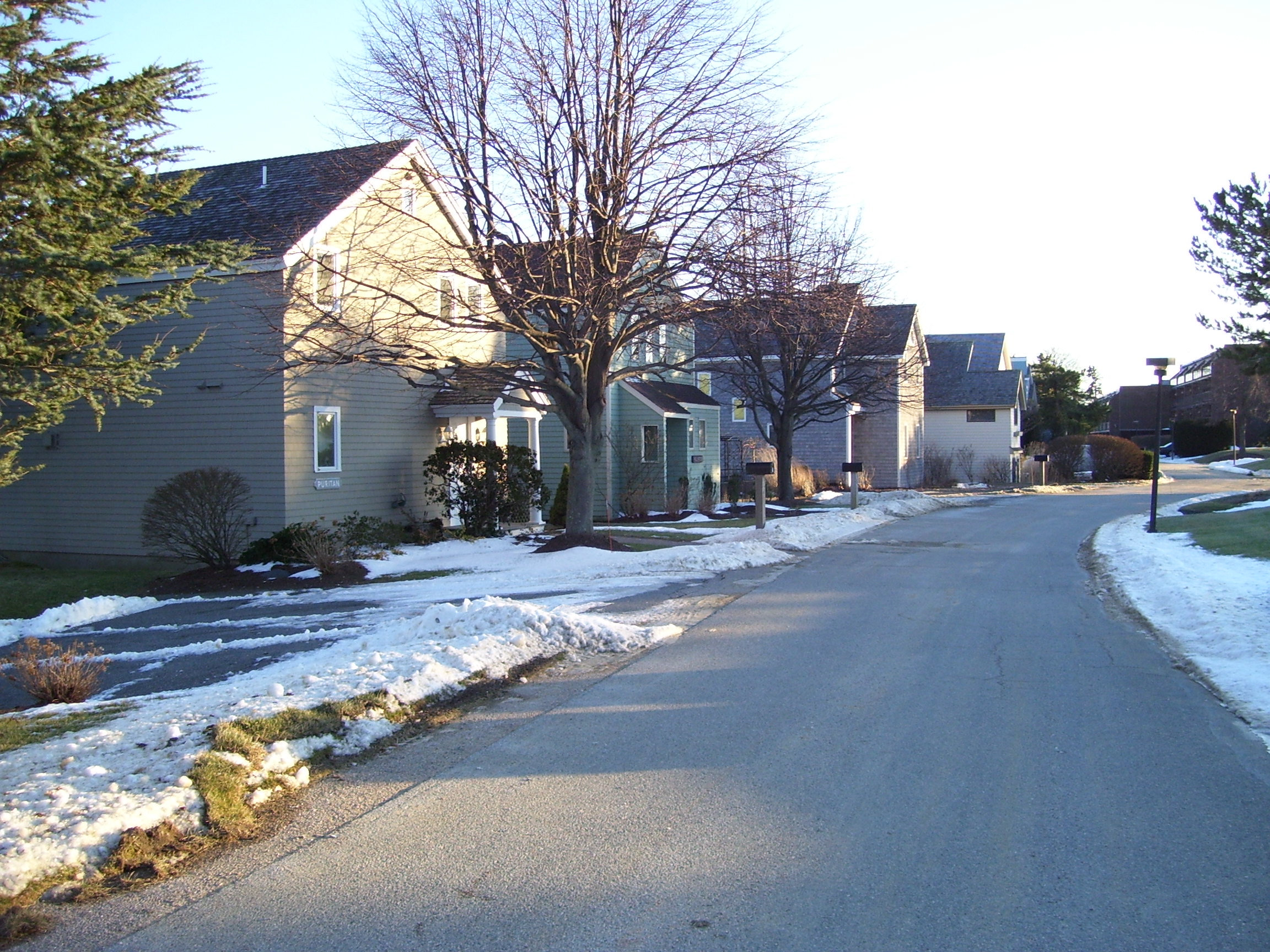
Harbor Houses on Goat Island

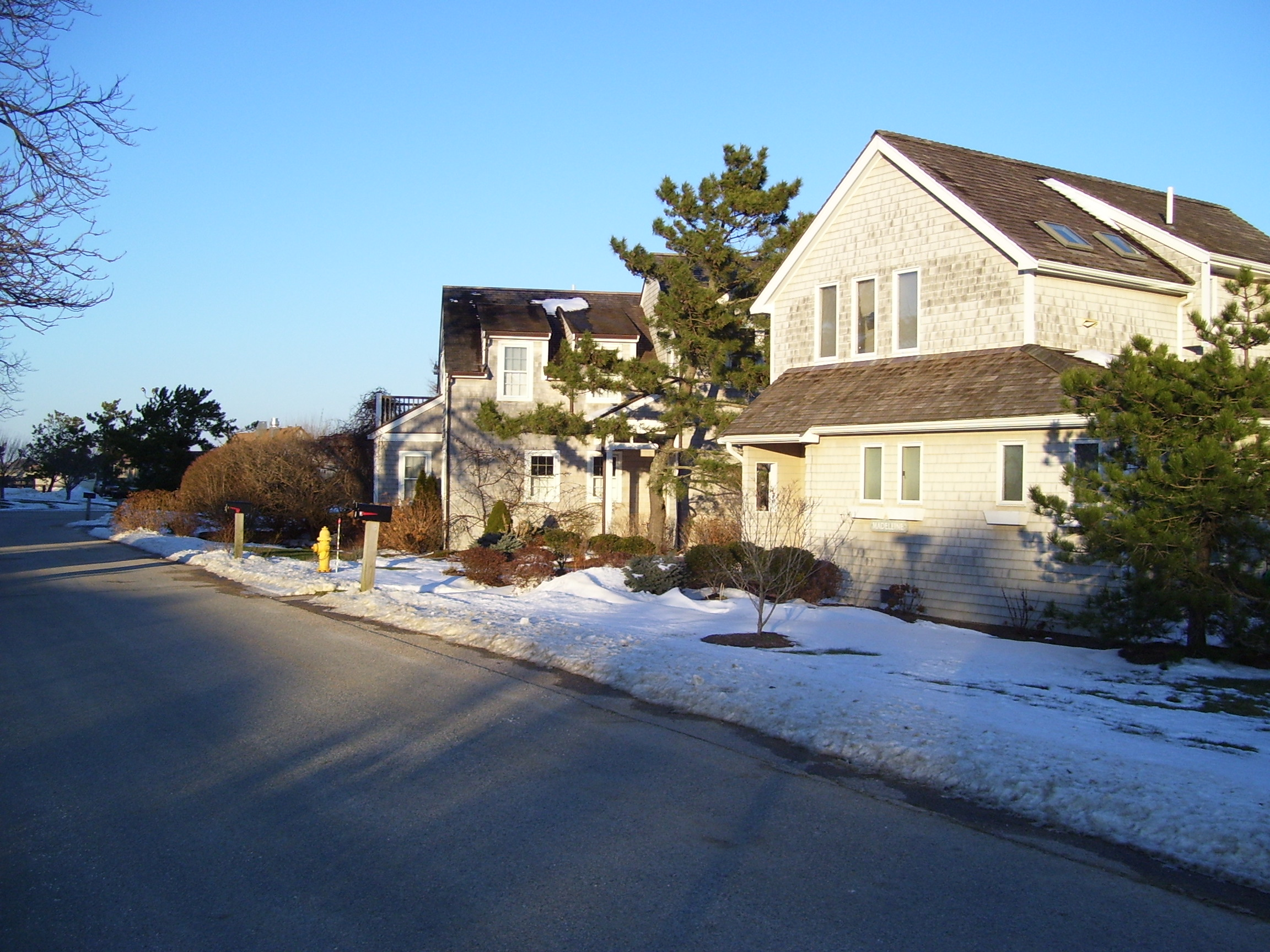
Harbor Houses on Goat Island

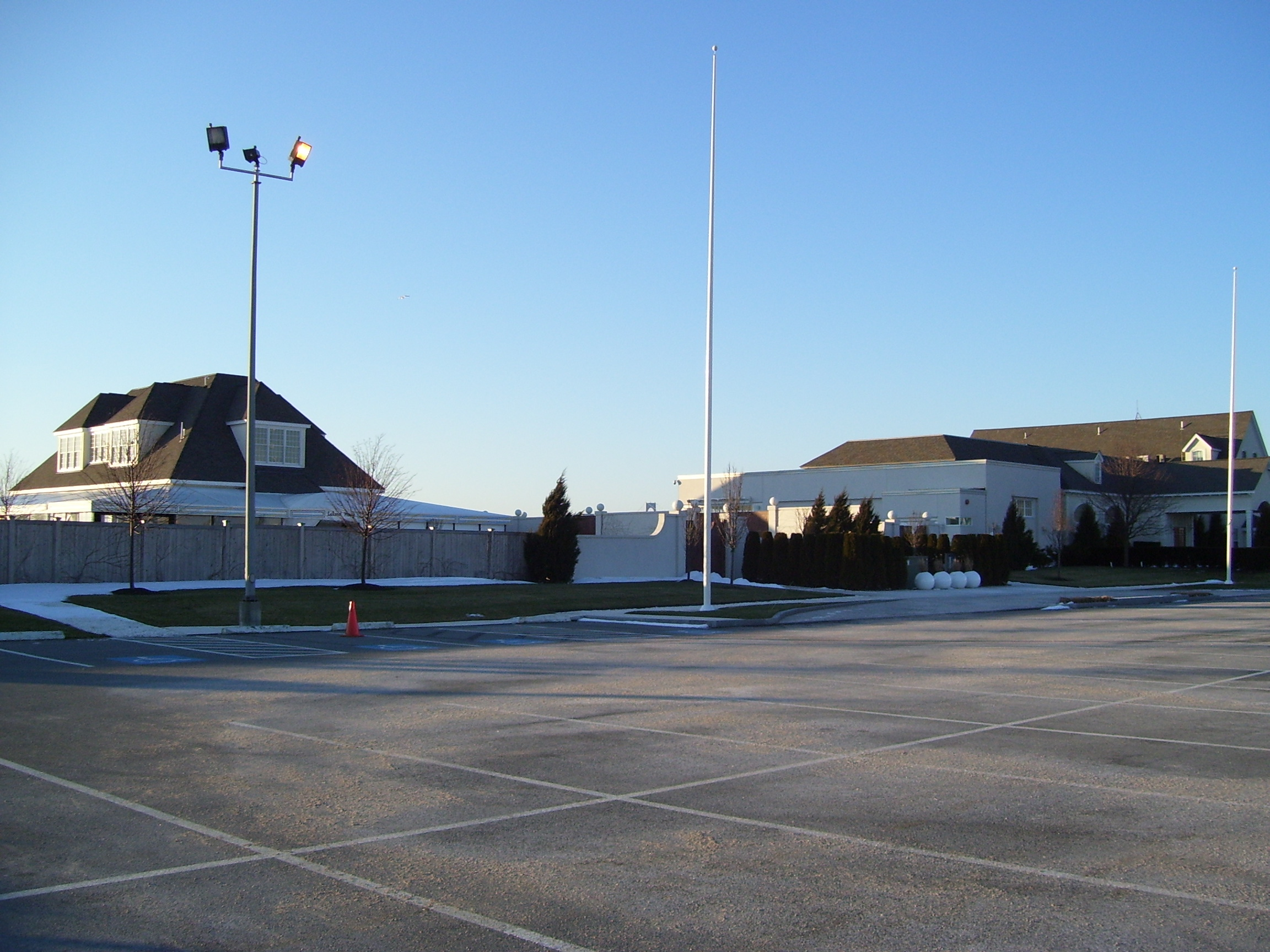
Belle Mer

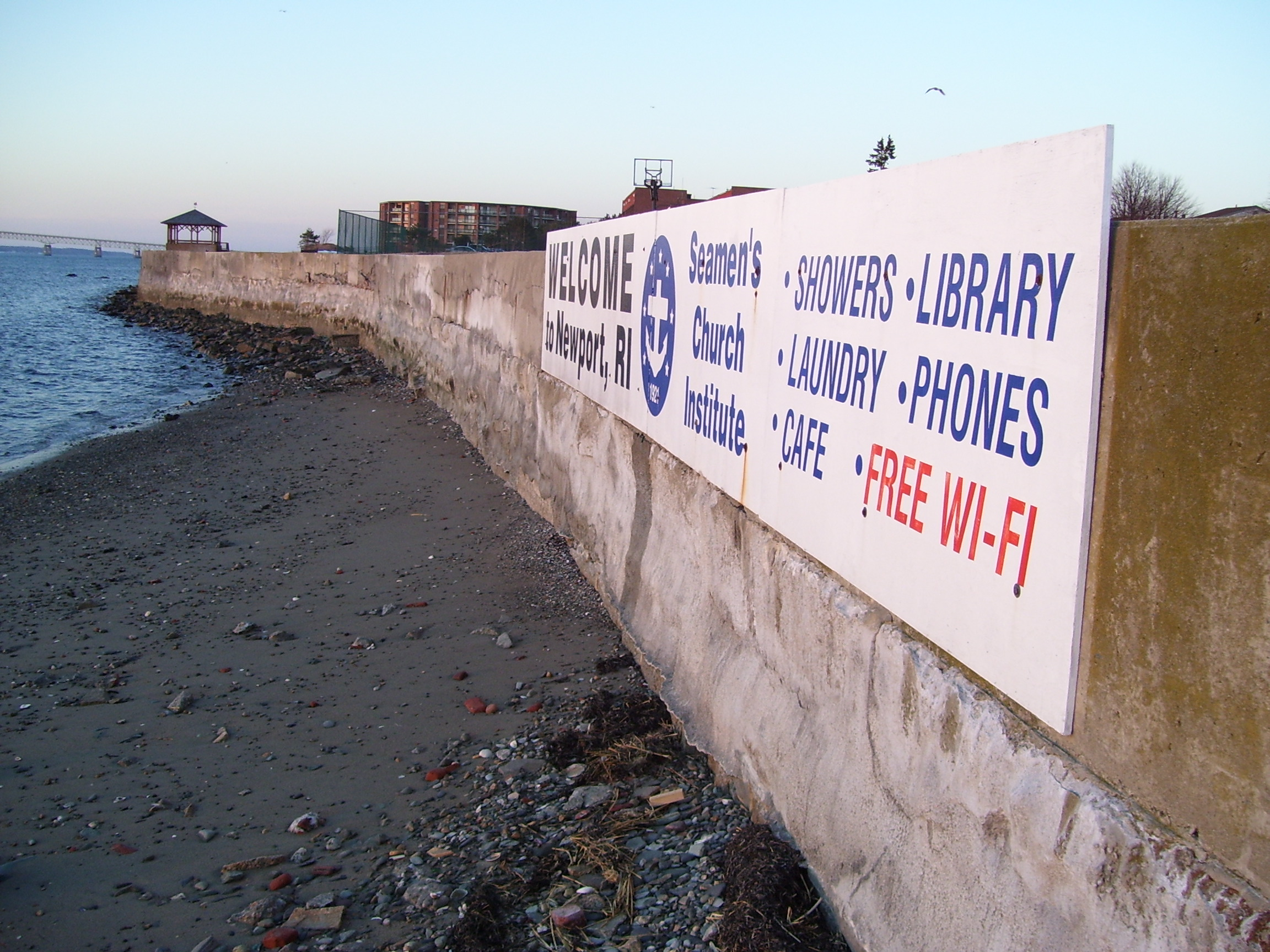
Seawall on Goat Island in Newport, Rhode Island

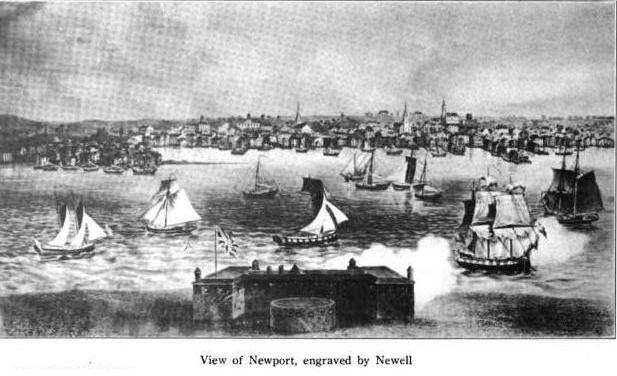
Fort George with colonial era Newport in the background
