= Liberty Affair =

1768 British seize of a ship in Boston

- Part of the American Revolution
- Date: June 10, 1768
- Location: Boston
- Caused by: Seizure of the ship Liberty

Parties
Customs officers, sailors of HMS Romney	Mob of colonists

Lead figures
Joseph Harrison, Benjamin Hallowell	Daniel Malcolm, John Hancock

Number
unknown	3000

Casualties and losses
Minor injuries	

The Liberty Affair or Liberty Riot was a confrontation in Boston on 10 June 1768, following British customs officials' seizure of the ship Liberty, a sloop owned by wealthy merchant and tax-protester John Hancock. Britain had sent the American Board of Customs to Boston in 1767 to enforce the collection of customs duties established by the Townshend Acts. The tough enforcement of revenue regulations were met by crowd violence. Rioters beat up customs officials, who were forced to flee to Castle William in Boston Harbor for safety. The event is another demonstration of growing colonial resistance to British rule, one in a series that led to the American Revolution.

== Liberty Affair ==
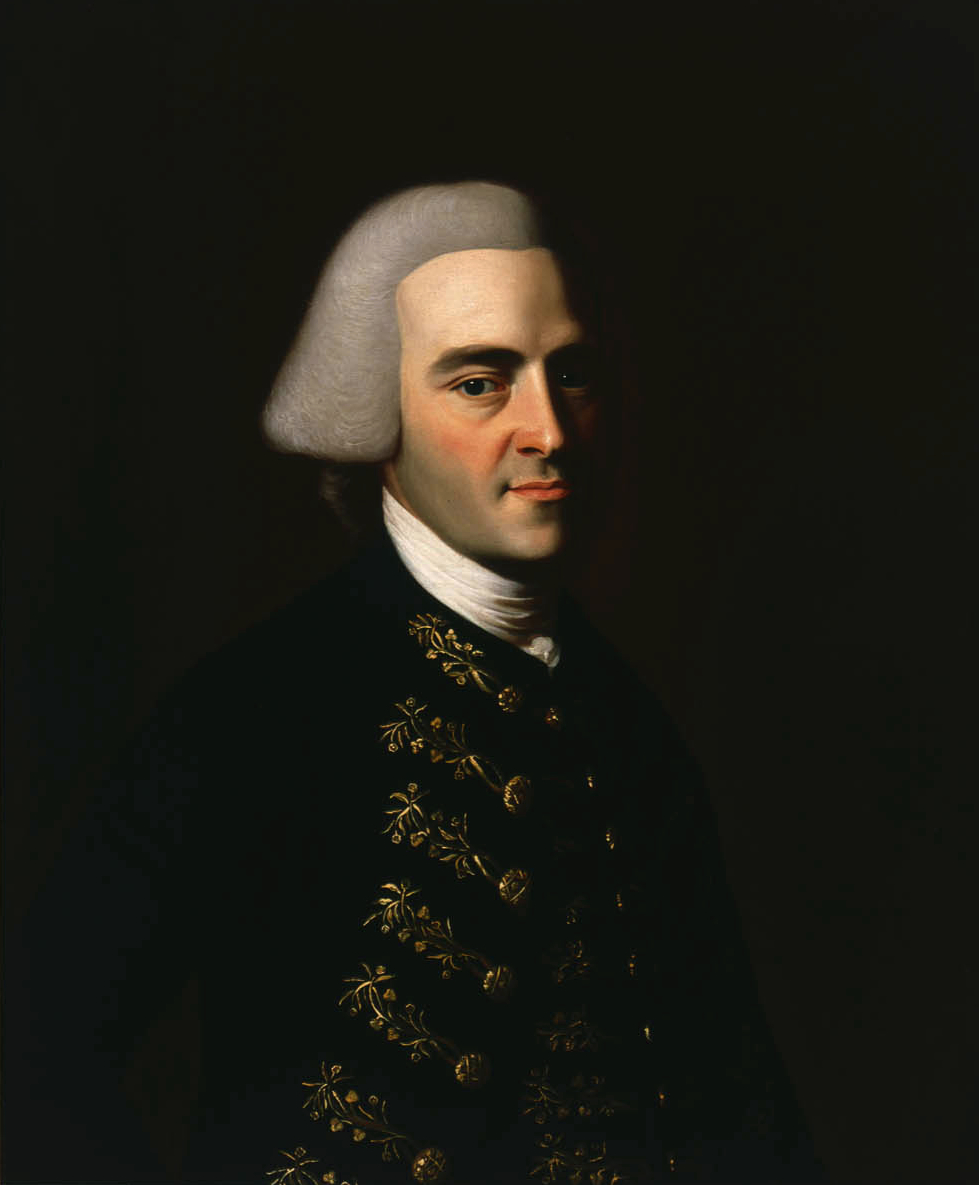
The Liberty Affair began with the seizure of John Hancock's ship, Liberty.

While the Liberty Affair took place on 10 June 1768, it was triggered by an earlier episode involving the smuggling of sixty casks of wine by Captain Daniel Malcolm in the spring of the same year. The new incident, which transpired on the evening of 9 May 1768, involved customs collectors boarding one of Hancock's ships, the Liberty. They found 25 pipes of Madeira wine, a figure far less than the ship was capable of carrying. Customs officials thought that the shipment was similar to the previous case of Malcolm's wine smuggling.

Initially, the two tidesmen who inspected the Liberty booty found no wrongdoing. However, a month later, when the Royal Navy warship Romney was docked in Boston, one of these customs officials recanted his account. Thomas Kirk, the customs collector, claimed that there were around 100 casks and that the crew off-loaded them so that only a quarter was left for customs tax payment. He stated that he was imprisoned aboard the vessel for refusing to accept Hancock's bribe. On June 10, a riot erupted after the British began the process of towing the Liberty to the Romney.

Malcolm, who was present when the British authorities boarded Liberty, published an account in the Boston Chronicle detailing the seizure of the ship as well as his confrontation with the authorities. The customs house was attacked and the sailors were forced to retreat to Romney and then to Castle William. The chief collector of customs, Joseph Harrison, his son, and Benjamin Hallowell, another customs official, were attacked by the mob when the crowd failed to block the British sailors who were towing the Liberty. Around 3,000 colonists participated in the riot.

An attempt at a compromise was led by Joseph Warren, who negotiated between Hancock and commissioners Hallowell and Harrison. The parties agreed to a settlement provided the government did not insist on taking strong actions against the Liberty and Hancock. The Whigs, however, were not satisfied by the agreement, which was supposed to mollify the mob and provide an opportunity for the government to save face. Boston demonstrators paraded and burned HMS Romney.

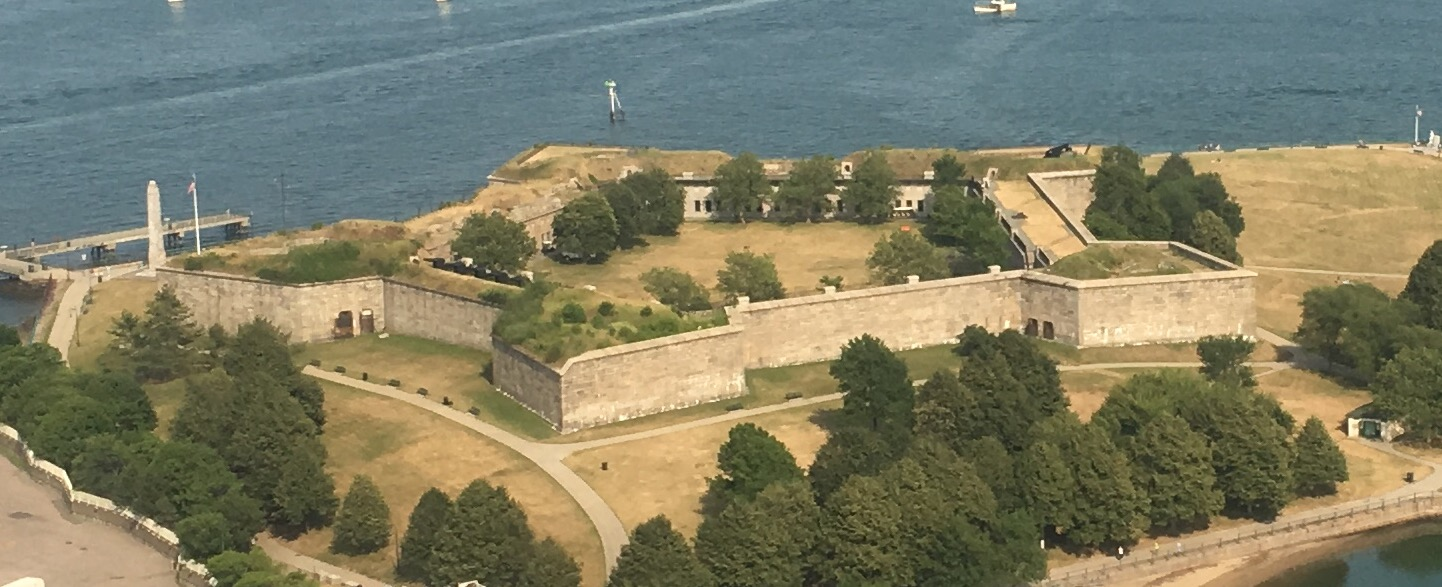
British customs officials and sailors fled to Castle William in Boston Harbor, now called Fort Independence, during the incident.

The British authorities filed a lawsuit against the Liberty and Hancock. John Adams was contracted to serve as Hancock's lawyer. The trial was considered a form of political persecution against Hancock, who was part of the opposition to the Stamp Act and was a prominent member and financier of Boston's Whig politics. While Hancock was guilty, the evidence presented was flimsy so that after five months of trial the charges were dropped. Hancock would later serve as the president of the colonists' revolutionary government and was the first to sign the American Declaration of Independence.

The Liberty remained in the possession of the Royal Navy. John Sewall, the advocate general for Massachusetts, secured the ship's forfeiture as it had violated British trade acts. Liberty became a sloop used to patrol the Rhode Island coast. In July 1769, it was burned by angry colonists after its crew seized two Connecticut ships.

== Aftermath ==
The Liberty Affair led the British Parliament to pass more restrictive laws to curb smuggling and increase troops to deal with colonial resistance in Massachusetts. Immediately after the Liberty Affair riot, Governor Francis Bernard was ordered to produce evidence against the leaders of the Boston insurrectionists so that they can be put to trial in England. Lord Hillsborough, the Secretary of State for the Colonies, also stationed two regiments from Halifax, Nova Scotia to garrison Boston. He also demanded the Massachusetts House of Representatives to rescind the circular requesting unity against the Townshend Acts or face dissolution. The House defied the order. The names of the 92 delegates who refused were commemorated in a "Liberty Bowl" created by the silversmith Paul Revere. These measures and incidents further contributed to the escalation of tensions. After the riot, there emerged a "snowballing" of events that would lead to the Boston Massacre. These events unified the colonies to support the non-importation policy of British goods, a development that Boston and Charleston was not able to accomplish previously.
