= Newport Harbor Light =

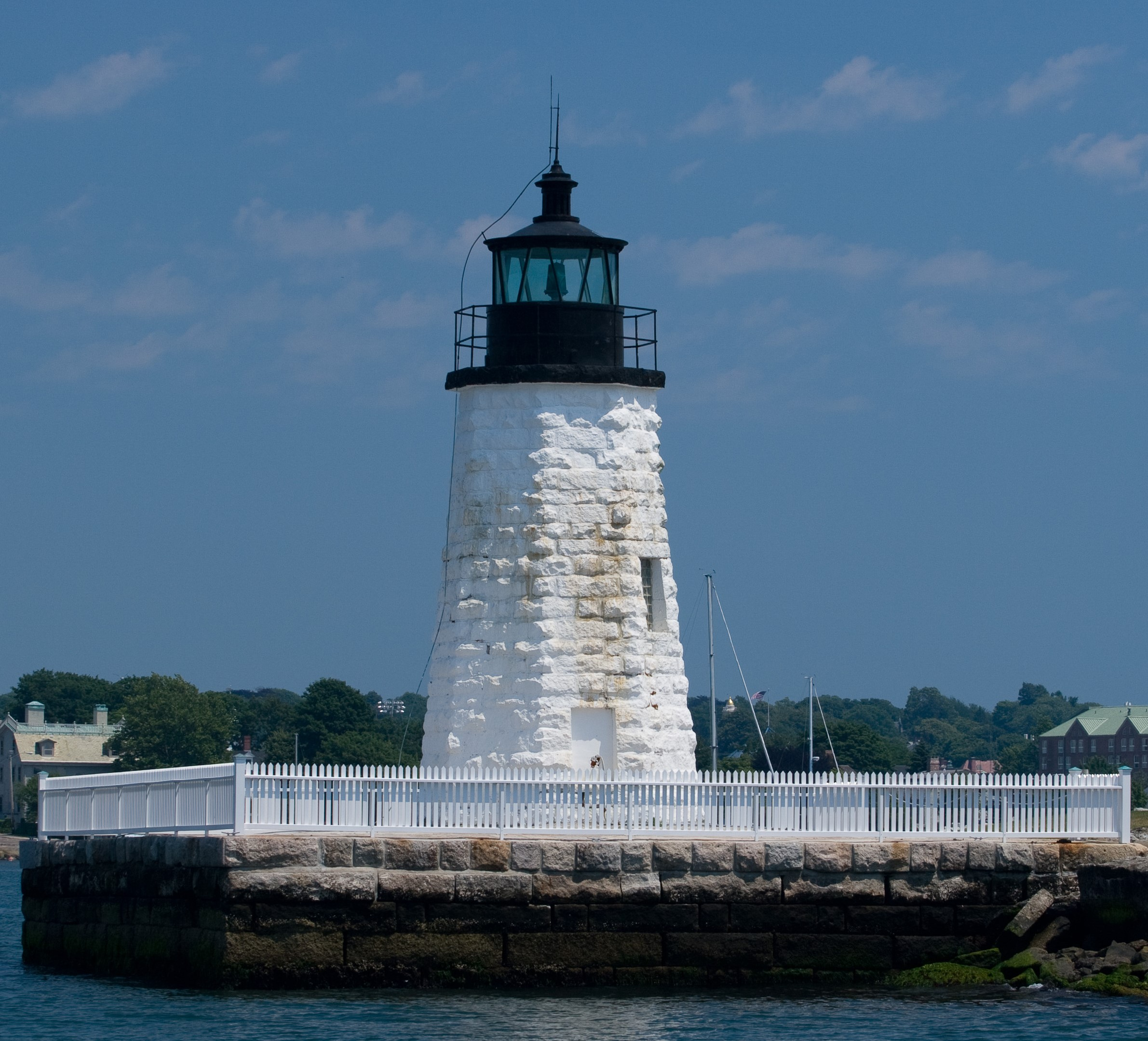
- Location: N. end of Goat Island, Newport Harbor, Newport, Rhode Island
- Coordinates: 41°29′35.92″N 71°19′37.34″W

Tower
- Constructed: 1823
- Foundation: Granite breakwater
- Construction: Granite blocks
- Automated: 1963
- Height: 35 feet (11 m)
- Shape: Octagonal conical
- Heritage: National Register of Historic Places listed place
- Fog signal: none

Light
- First lit: 1842 (current tower)
- Focal height: 33 feet (10 m)
- Lens: Fourth order Fresnel lens (original), 250 mm (9.8 in) (current)
- Range: 11 nautical miles (20 km; 13 mi)
- Characteristic: Fixed Green
- Newport Harbor Lighthouse
- U.S. National Register of Historic Places
- Area: less than one acre
- Built: 1865
- MPS: Lighthouses of Rhode Island TR
- NRHP reference No.: 88000276
- Added to NRHP: March 30, 1988

The Newport Harbor Light, also known as the Goat Island Light or Green Light, built in 1842, is located on north end of Goat Island, which is part of the city of Newport, Rhode Island, United States, in Narragansett Bay. The light was added to the National Register of Historic Places in 1988.

== History ==
The first light on Goat Island was constructed in 1823–1824, but was transported in 1851 to Prudence Island, where the structure still remains as the Prudence Island Light. The current light was constructed in 1842 a few yards off the coast of Goat Island, and was connected to Goat Island by a narrow dike (the area was filled in the 1960s for the hotel) because the previous light failed in adequately warning ships of a reef just a few yards off Goat Island. The original lighting apparatus, however, was transferred to the newer lighthouse in 1842.

In 1864, an attached lighthouse keeper's house was built. In 1921, a submarine hit the breakwater, damaging the foundation of the keeper's house. An electric light was placed in the tower the following year. The damaged keeper's dwelling was later torn down.

After a private developer purchased Goat Island in the 1960s, the land between the northern end of Goat Island and the light was filled in to build a hotel. In 2000, the Coast Guard leased the light to the American Lighthouse Foundation; it is managed by the Friends of Newport Harbor Lighthouse.

== Gallery ==
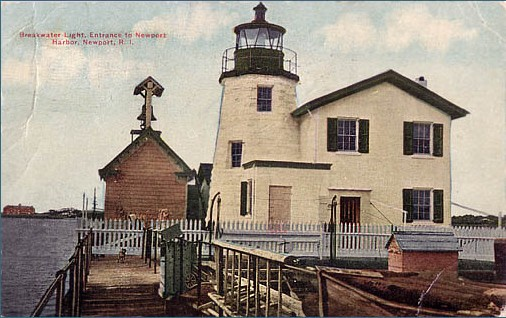
Postcard c. 1905 of the Newport Harbor Light with the 1864 keeper's house still attached

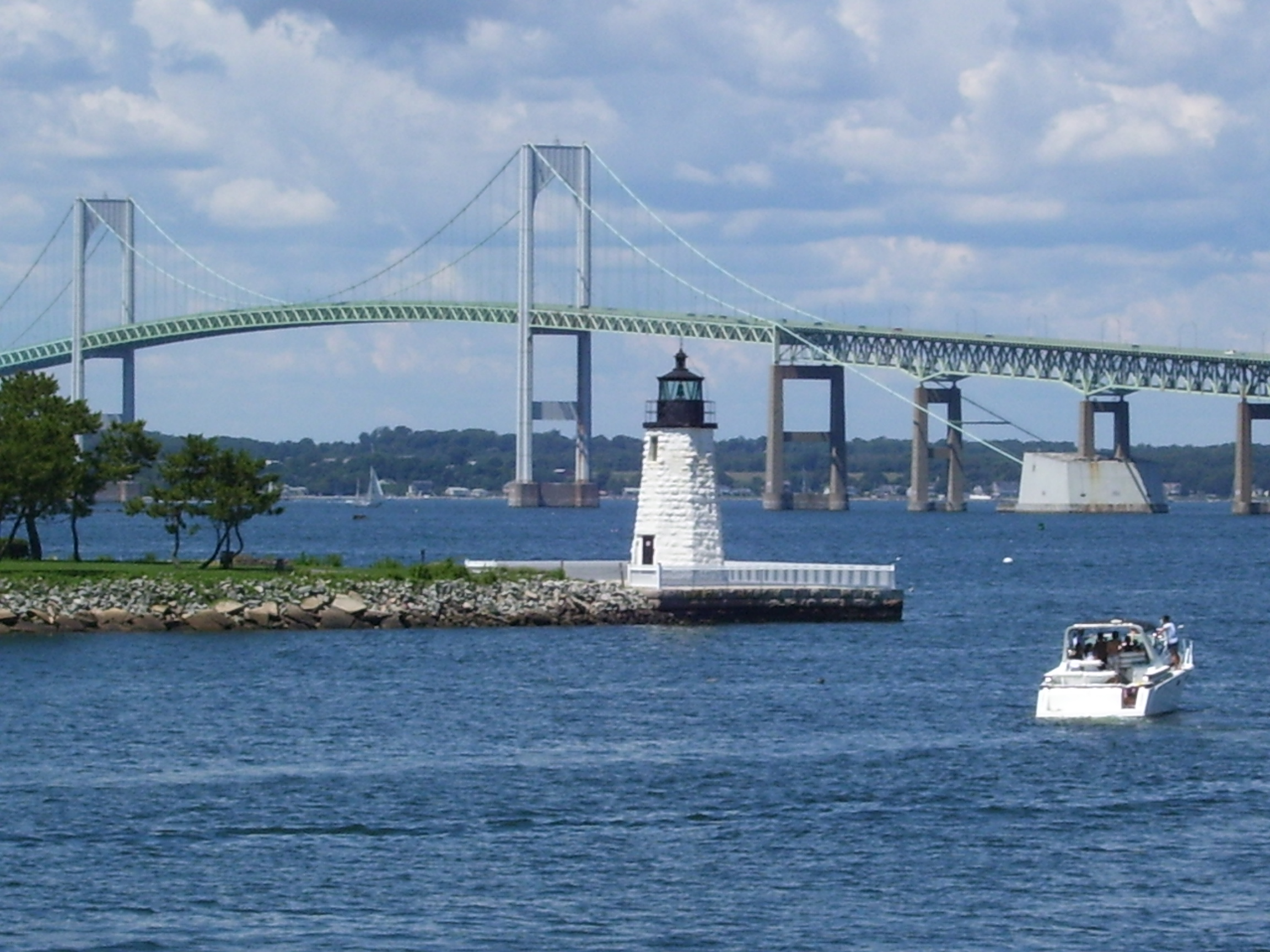
The lighthouse with the Newport Bridge in the background

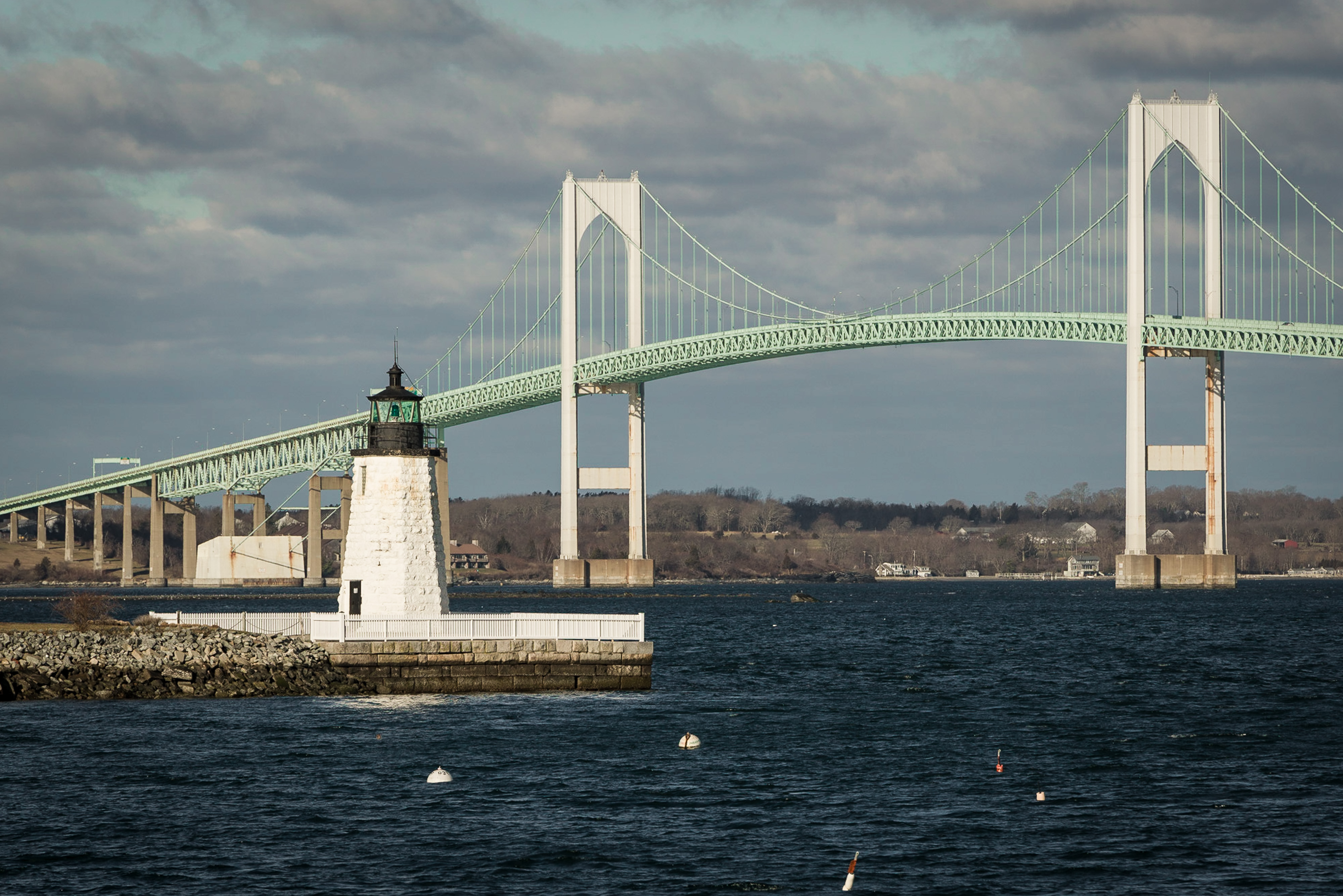
The light in 2014

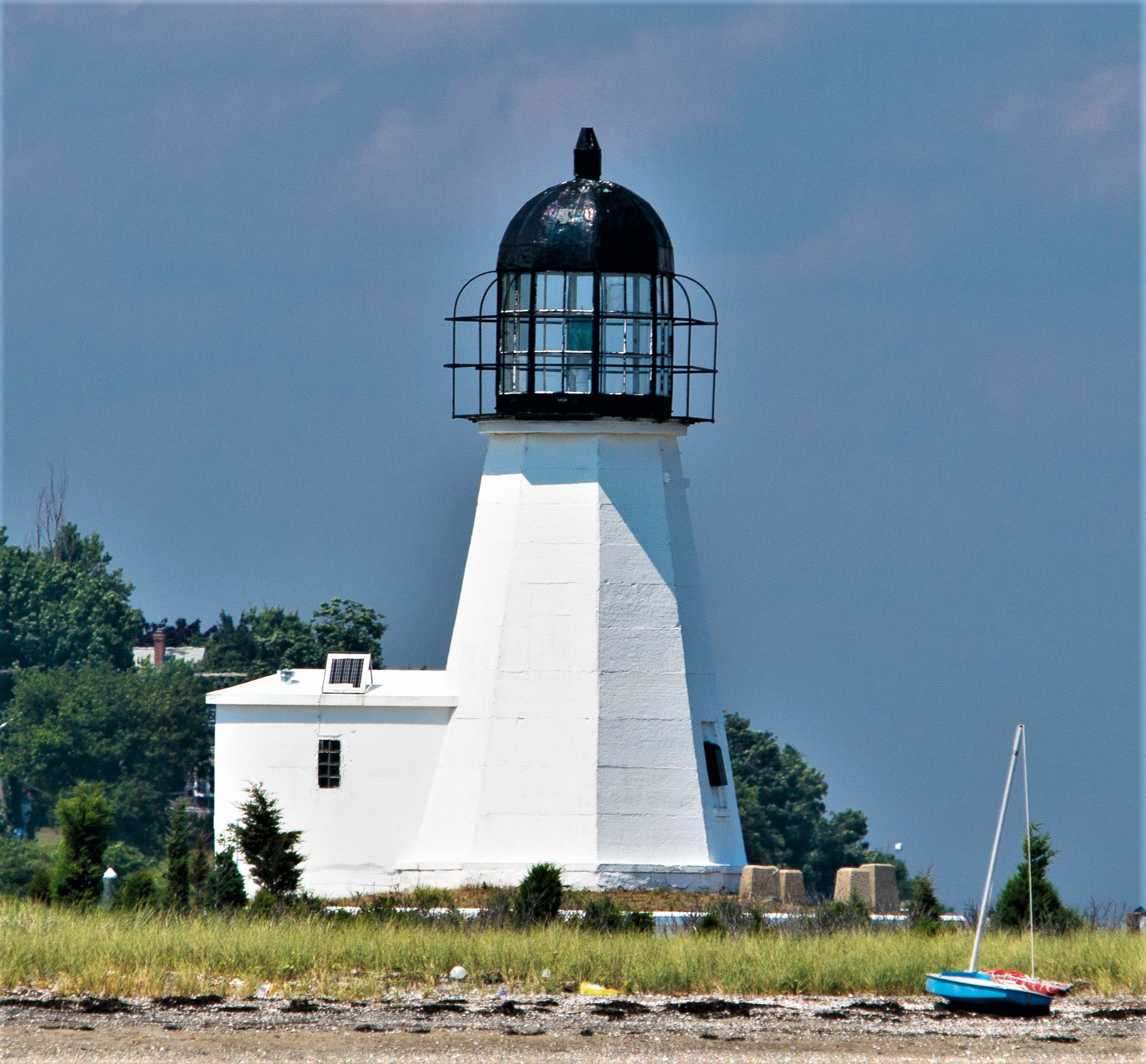
Prudence Island Light, circa 1824, was the original Newport Harbor Lighthouse until it was transported to Prudence Island in 1851.

== See also ==
- National Register of Historic Places listings in Newport County, Rhode Island
