= HMS Liberty (1768) =

Sloop owned by John Hancock

History

Great Britain
- Name: Liberty
- Owner: John Hancock
- Captured: June 1768

Great Britain
- Name: Liberty
- Acquired: June 1768
- Fate: Scuttled and burned, Newport, Rhode Island, July 1769

General characteristics
- Class & type: Sloop

Liberty was a sloop owned by John Hancock, an American merchant, whose seizure was the subject of the Liberty Affair. Seized by customs officials in Boston in 1768, it was commissioned into the Royal Navy as HMS Liberty, and she was burned the next year by American colonists in Newport, Rhode Island, in one of the first acts of open defiance against the Crown by American colonists.

== History ==
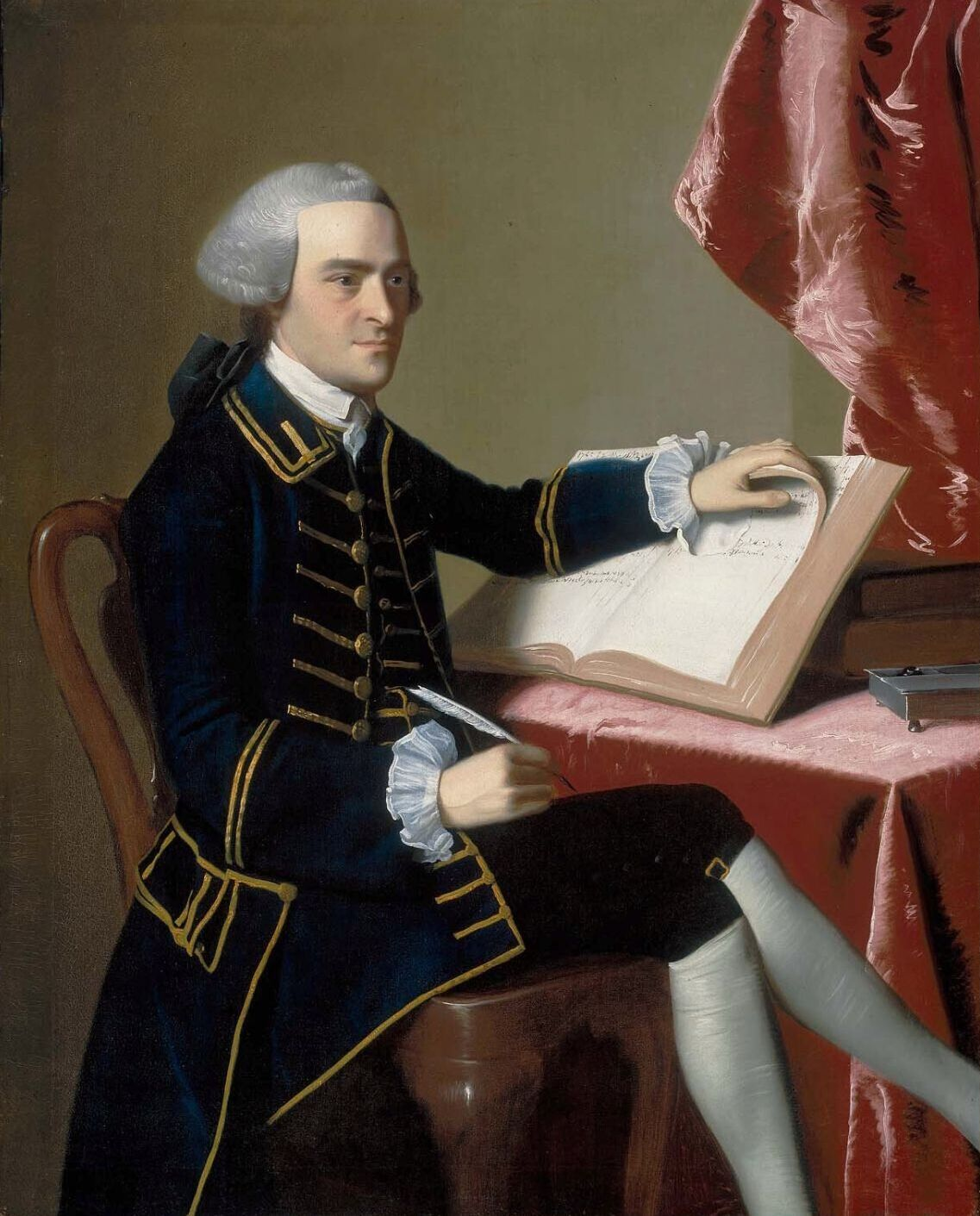
John Hancock, original owner of Liberty

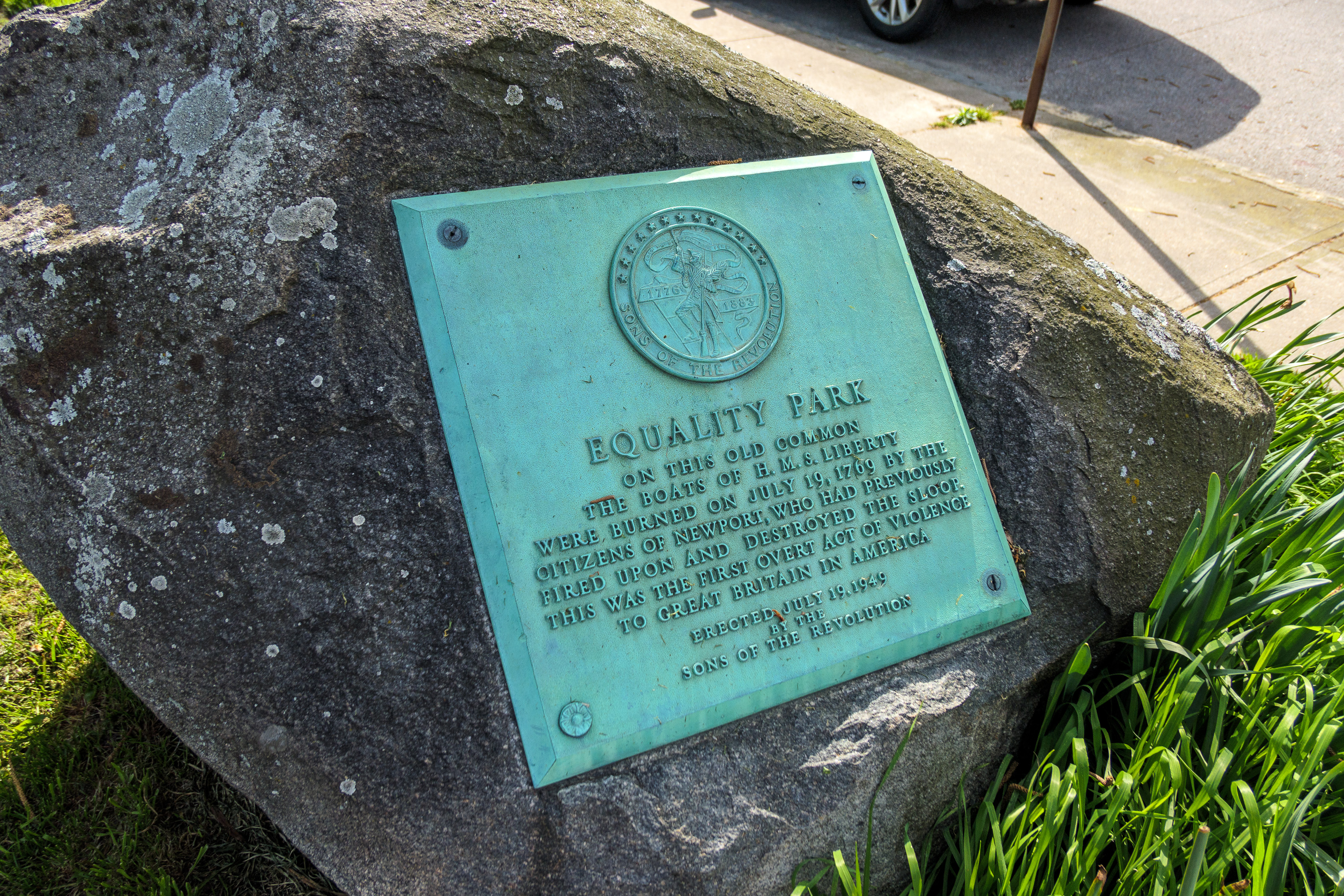
Plaque in Equality Park

The ship was originally owned by John Hancock. In 1768, British authorities were informed that Bostonians had locked a Bostons customs official in the Liberty's cabin while the cargo of Madeira wine was unloaded in an effort to evade the Townshend Acts. In response, the authorities confiscated Liberty, and she was towed away by HMS Halifax. Charges against Hancock were eventually dropped, but Liberty remained confiscated.

The ship was refitted in Rhode Island to serve as a Royal Navy ship named HMS Liberty and then used to patrol off Rhode Island for customs violations. On 19 July 1769, the crew of Liberty under Captain William Reid accosted Joseph Packwood, a New London captain, and seized and towed two Connecticut ships into Newport. In retribution, Packwood and a mob of Rhode Islanders confronted Reid, then boarded, scuttled, and later burned the ship on the north end of Goat Island in Newport harbor as one of the first overt American acts of defiance against the Crown.

== See also ==
- Gaspée Affair
- HMS St. John
