= USCGC Tiger Shark =

United States Coast Guard patrol boat

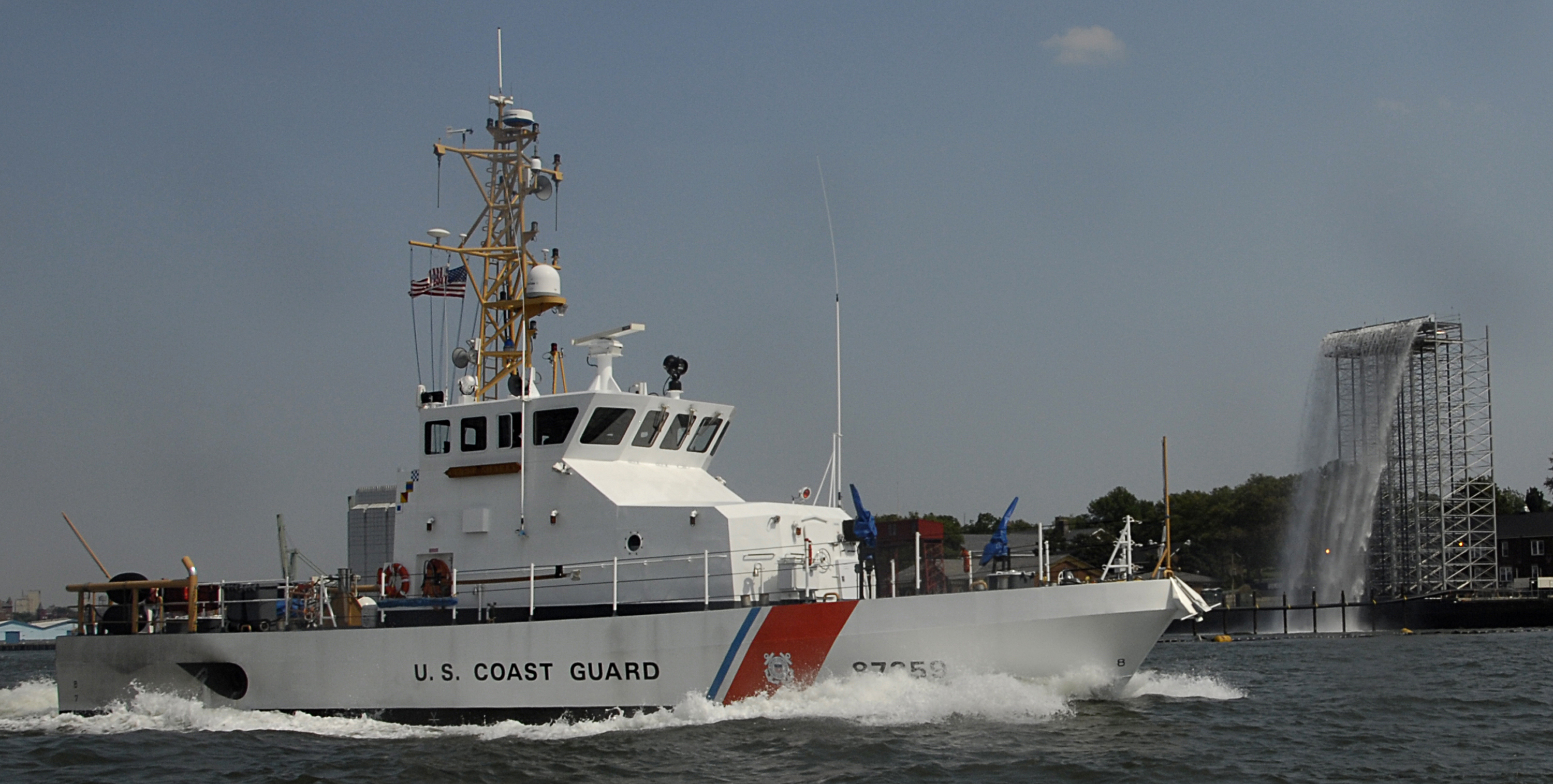
- Tiger Shark under way

History

United States
- Name: Tiger Shark
- Namesake: Tiger shark
- Operator: United States Coast Guard
- Builder: Bollinger Shipyards, Lockport, Louisiana
- Commissioned: July 2005
- Home port: Newport, Rhode Island (from 2005); Gulfport, Mississippi (by 2023)
- Identification: Hull number: WPB-87359
- Status: In active service

General characteristics
- Class & type: Marine Protector-class patrol boat
- Length: 87 ft (27 m)

USCGC Tiger Shark (WPB-87359) is an 87-foot (27 m) Marine Protector-class patrol boat of the United States Coast Guard. It was commissioned in July 2005 at Newport, Rhode Island, its first homeport. By 2023 it was based at Coast Guard Station Gulfport in Gulfport, Mississippi, where its missions range from search and rescue to drug and fisheries law enforcement in the Gulf of Mexico.

== Design ==
Tiger Shark is one of the Marine Protector-class coastal patrol boats built for the Coast Guard by Bollinger Shipyards of Lockport, Louisiana, under a contract first awarded on March 13, 1996. The class replaced the older 82-foot Point-class cutters.

== Service history ==
=== Rhode Island ===
Tiger Shark was commissioned in July 2005 at a ceremony at Fort Adams State Park in Newport. Rear Admiral David Pekoske, then commander of the Coast Guard's First District, commissioned the cutter, and Congressman James Langevin gave the keynote address. In July 2008 Tiger Shark visited New York Harbor for the city's Fourth of July celebrations.

=== Gulf Coast ===
By 2023 Tiger Shark had moved to Gulfport, Mississippi, as one of two 87-foot patrol boats based at Coast Guard Station Gulfport. In January 2023 its crew found a disabled skiff carrying four overdue boaters near Biloxi after partner agencies had been searching for them. On February 26, 2025, the cutter patrolled the Mississippi River near the ferry terminal in New Orleans as part of maritime security operations for Mardi Gras.

== See also ==
- List of United States Coast Guard cutters
