= Randolph Bullock =

American museum curator

Randolph Bullock (c. 1903 – 1999) was an American museum curator who served in the Department of Arms and Armor at the Metropolitan Museum of Art.

== Early life and education ==
Bullock was born in Newport, Rhode Island, and was descended from the Goddard family of cabinet makers. He graduated from the Rhode Island School of Design in 1924.

== Career ==
In 1926, Bullock began working at the Metropolitan Museum as an illustrator, tasked with creating measured drawings of items in the museum's arms and armor collection. He became assistant curator in 1937. During World War II, Bullock served in the Army Air Corps, where he interpreted aerial reconnaissance photographs, before returning to the museum. He was appointed curator of the department in 1964.

In 1956, Bullock designed the galleries for arms and armor in the J. P. Morgan Wing, establishing a permanent exhibition space for the collection. An installation of four equestrian knights, which Bullock had supervised in the 1920s, was a central element of the wing; the success of this display was a factor in his later appointment to curator.

During his tenure, Bullock was involved in the acquisition of new items. A notable example was the museum's long-term effort to acquire a fowling piece made for Louis XIII of France. The gun is considered a significant 17th-century firearm, being one of only three known flintlocks made in the workshop of Pierre and Marin Le Bourgeoys, who are credited with inventing the flintlock mechanism. Curators at the museum, who referred to the weapon as "the most beautiful gun in the world", had been attempting to acquire it from private collector William G. Renwick since the 1920s. Following Renwick's death in 1972, Bullock secured the gun for the museum at a Sotheby's auction for a price of $300,000.

Bullock trained under Daniel Tachaux, the museum's first full-time armorer, who had apprenticed with Napoleon III's armorer. Tachaux's tools were later used by Bullock's successor, Stephen Grancsay, in designing the helmet worn by U.S. soldiers during World War II.
