= Easton's Point =

Neighborhood in Rhode Island, United States

Coordinates: 41°29′42.28″N 71°19′10.69″W

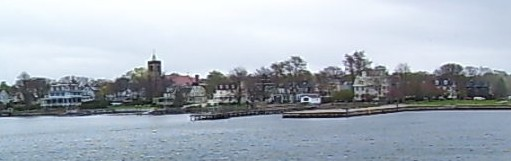
"The Point" from the Goat Island causeway bridge

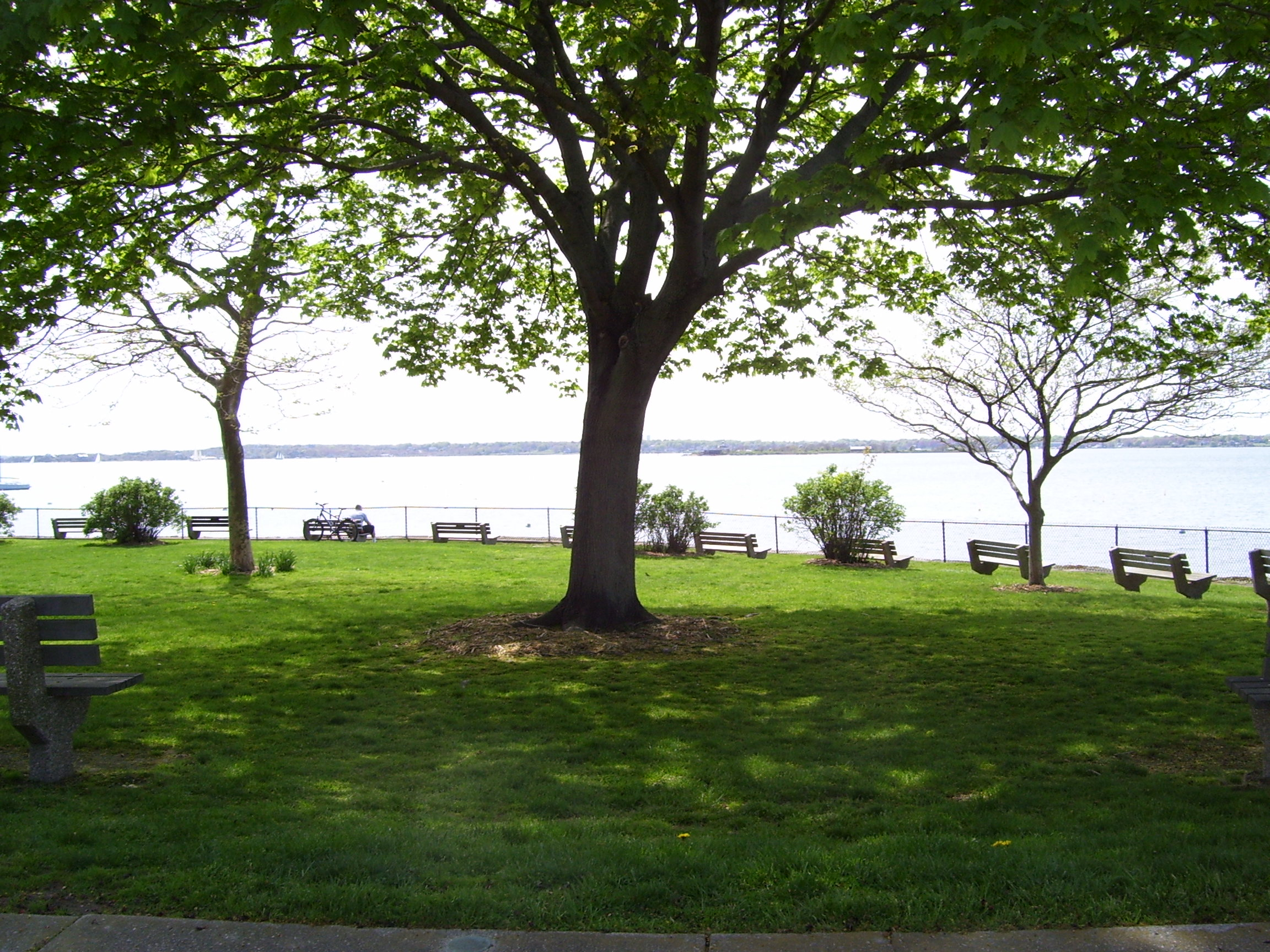
Battery Park in Newport

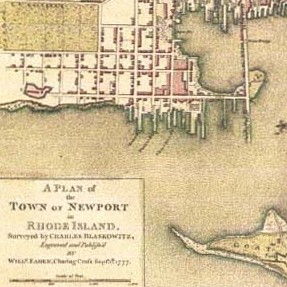
Goat Island and Easton's Point with Long Wharf on the right before the marsh was filled in (1777 Newport map)

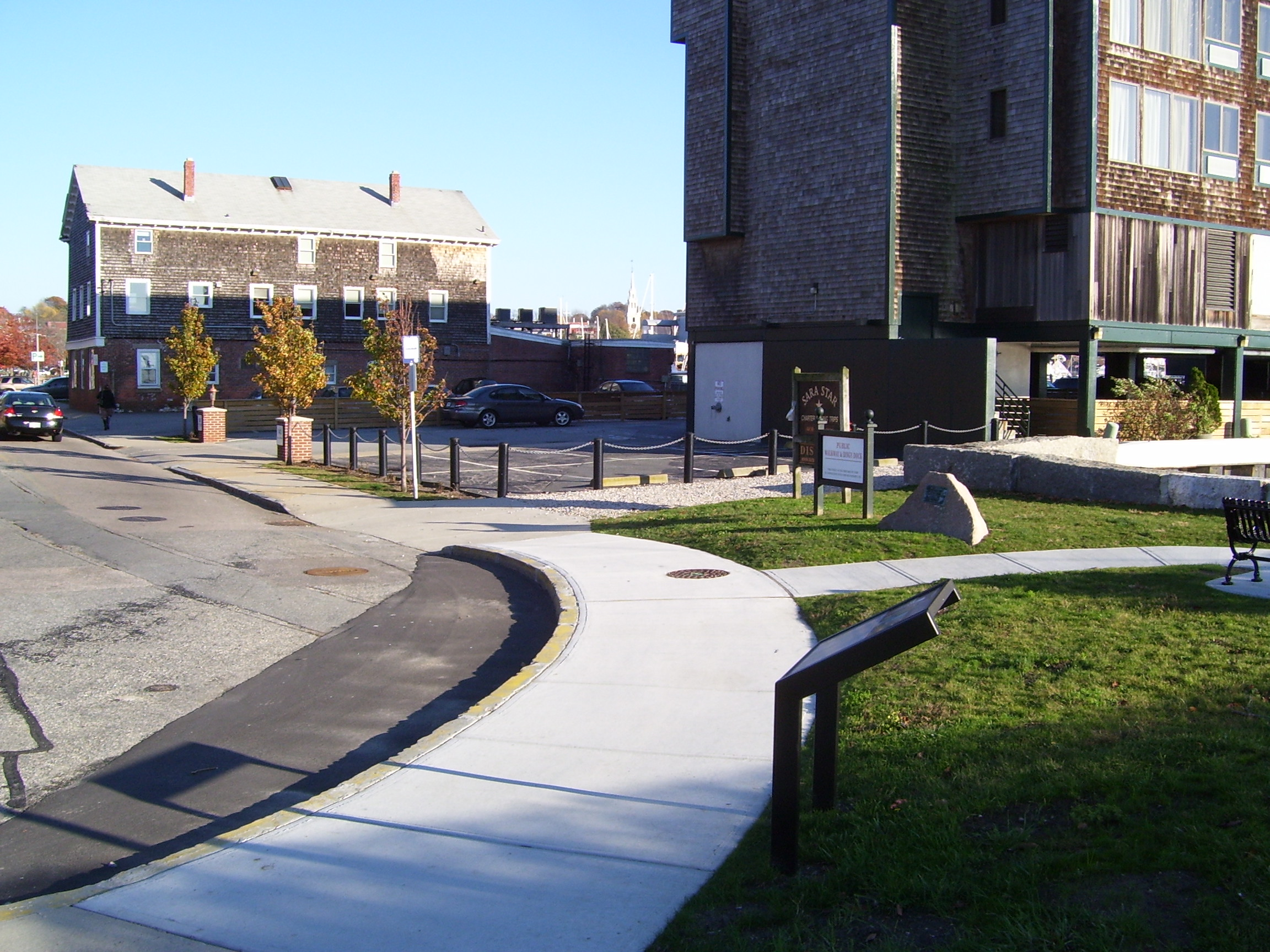
Gravelly Point off of Long Wharf, was the site of the largest public mass execution in American history, when 26 pirates were executed. They were then buried on Goat Island.

The Point (or less commonly, "Easton's Point") is one of the oldest neighborhoods in Newport, Rhode Island and has one of the highest concentrations of colonial houses in the United States. The neighborhood sits between Washington Street and Farewell Street/America's Cup in Newport looking out on Goat Island, former home to the U.S. Naval Torpedo Station.

== History ==
Nicholas Easton, a founder of Newport, first settled in the area in the 17th century. Easton's heirs divided the property into lots in 1725 and sold parcels to many of Newport's early tradesmen and merchants. Many of the early inhabitants attended the nearby Quaker Meeting House or Touro Synagogue. None of the streets were originally named after people because of a Quaker tradition, so 1st (now Washington), 2nd, and 3rd Streets were intersected by streets with tree names (Elm, Poplar, Willow, Walnut, Chestnut, Cherry, Pine, Sycamore, and Cypress). Marsh Street was formerly the site of a marsh, and Bridge Street was the site of a bridge traversing the north side of the marsh. Long Wharf jutted across the south side of the marsh until it was filled in the 19th century.

In 1723, Gravelly Point (off of Long Wharf) was the site of the largest public mass execution in American history, when 26 pirates were executed. They were then buried on nearby Goat Island.

Various houses in "The Point" were occupied by British and French forces during the American Revolution around the time of the Battle of Rhode Island. The famous Goddard and Townsend furniture makers lived and worked in The Point, and their houses still remain. Battery Park was created from Fort Greene, a former military battery from the War of 1812, on the site of a previous battery from the American Revolution.

== Revitalization ==
Newport has remained largely unindustrialized, so many of the historic colonial houses were not demolished, as was done in Boston and New York. As a result, Newport allegedly has the highest concentration of colonial homes of any American city. The Point, however, was largely neglected by the 1950s and remained a working class area. In the 1960s and 70s, Doris Duke's Newport Restoration Foundation bought 27 historic houses in The Point, restored them, and currently rents the homes to tenants. In the 1960s, the construction of the Newport Bridge divided the neighborhood in two.

The Point is home to the Hunter House museum, the Rumbline Restaurant, and Saint John the Evangelist Anglican-Catholic Church. The old docks disappeared at the end of the streets but the driftways remained, allowing public access to the harbor for boaters.

== Images ==
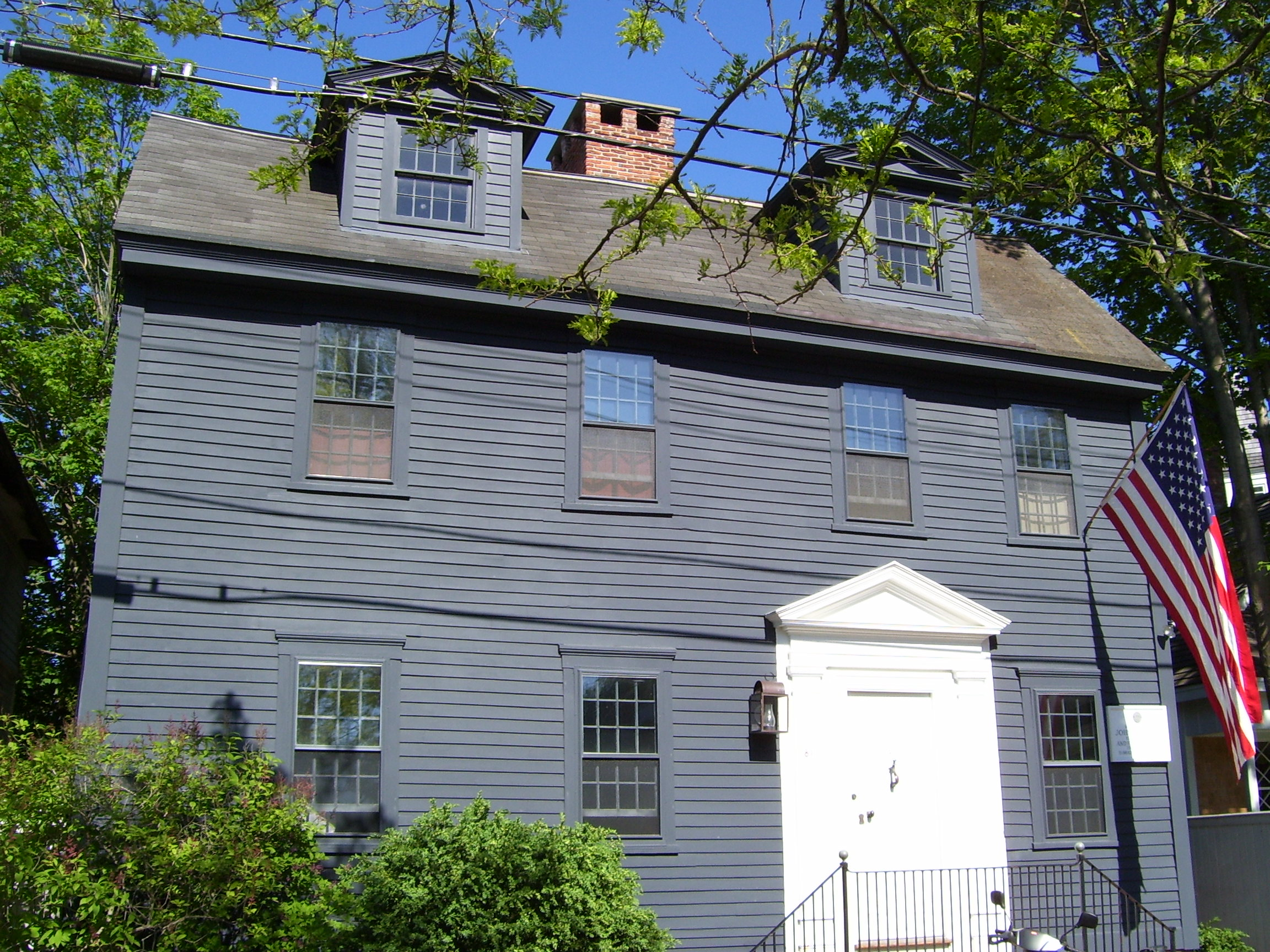
18th century Second Street home of the Goddard family (of Townsend and Goddard furniture)

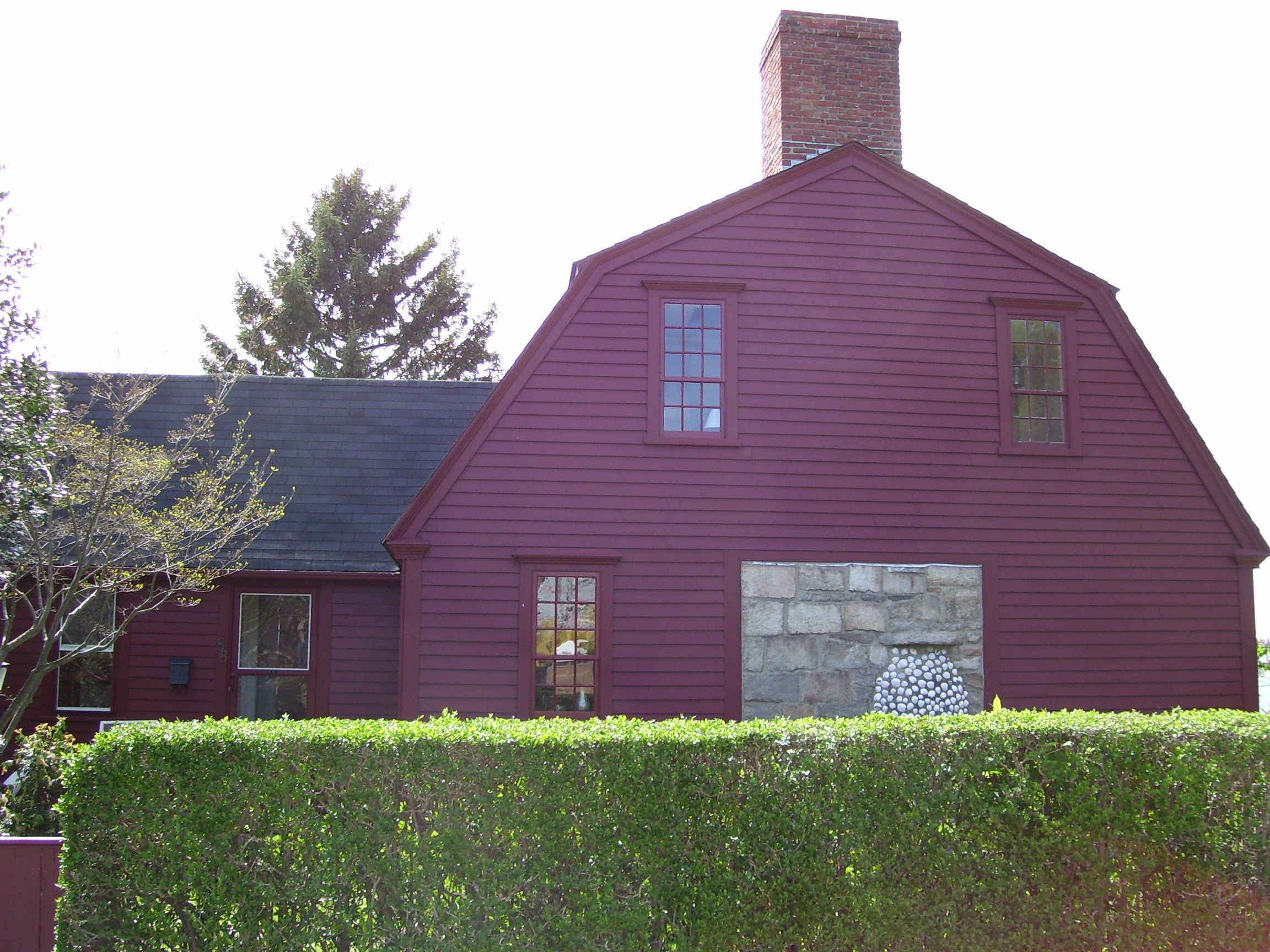
Tripp House stone-ender, 1720, on Washington Street

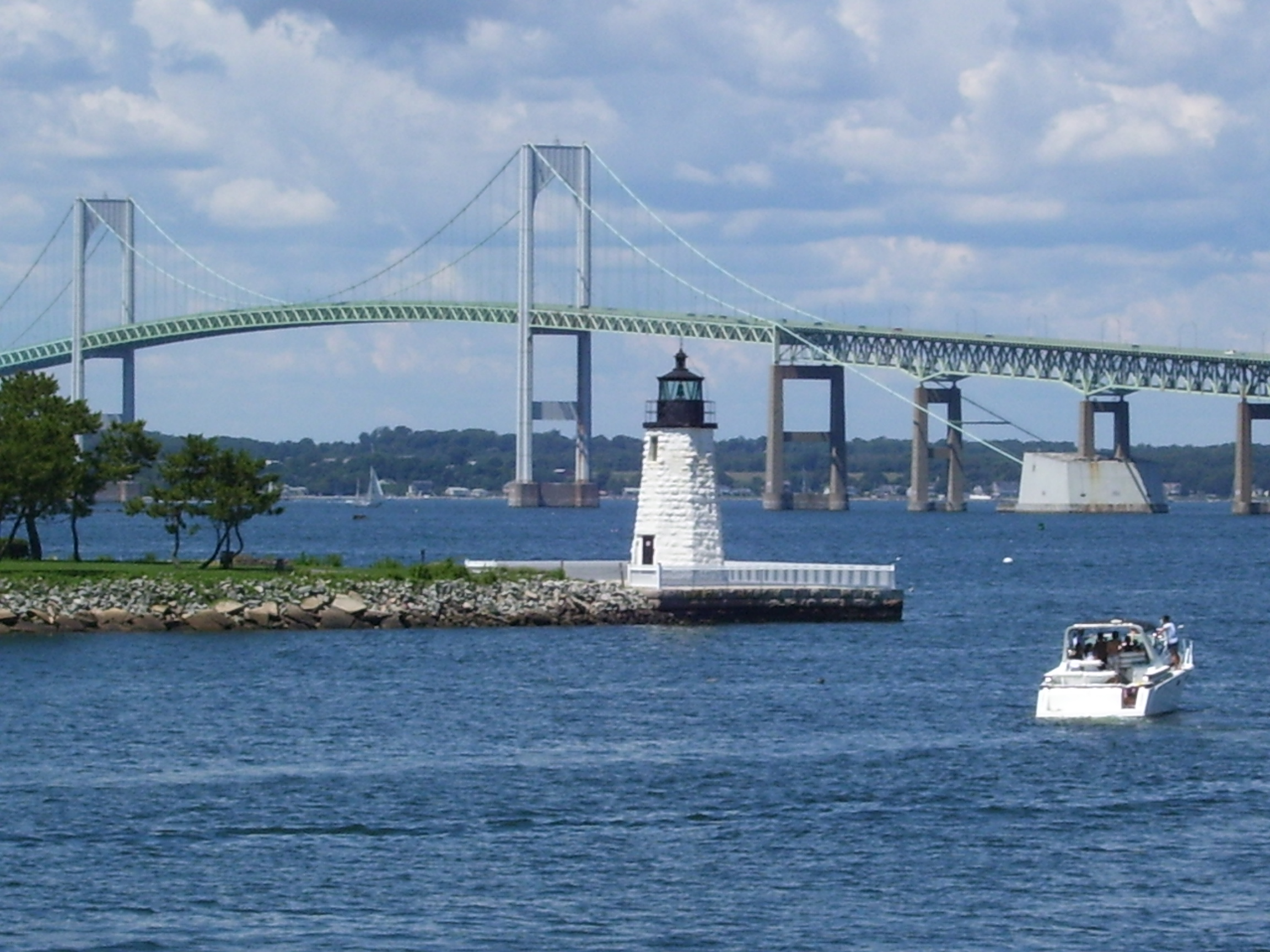
Newport Harbor Light (1842) on northern tip of Goat Island and the Newport Bridge

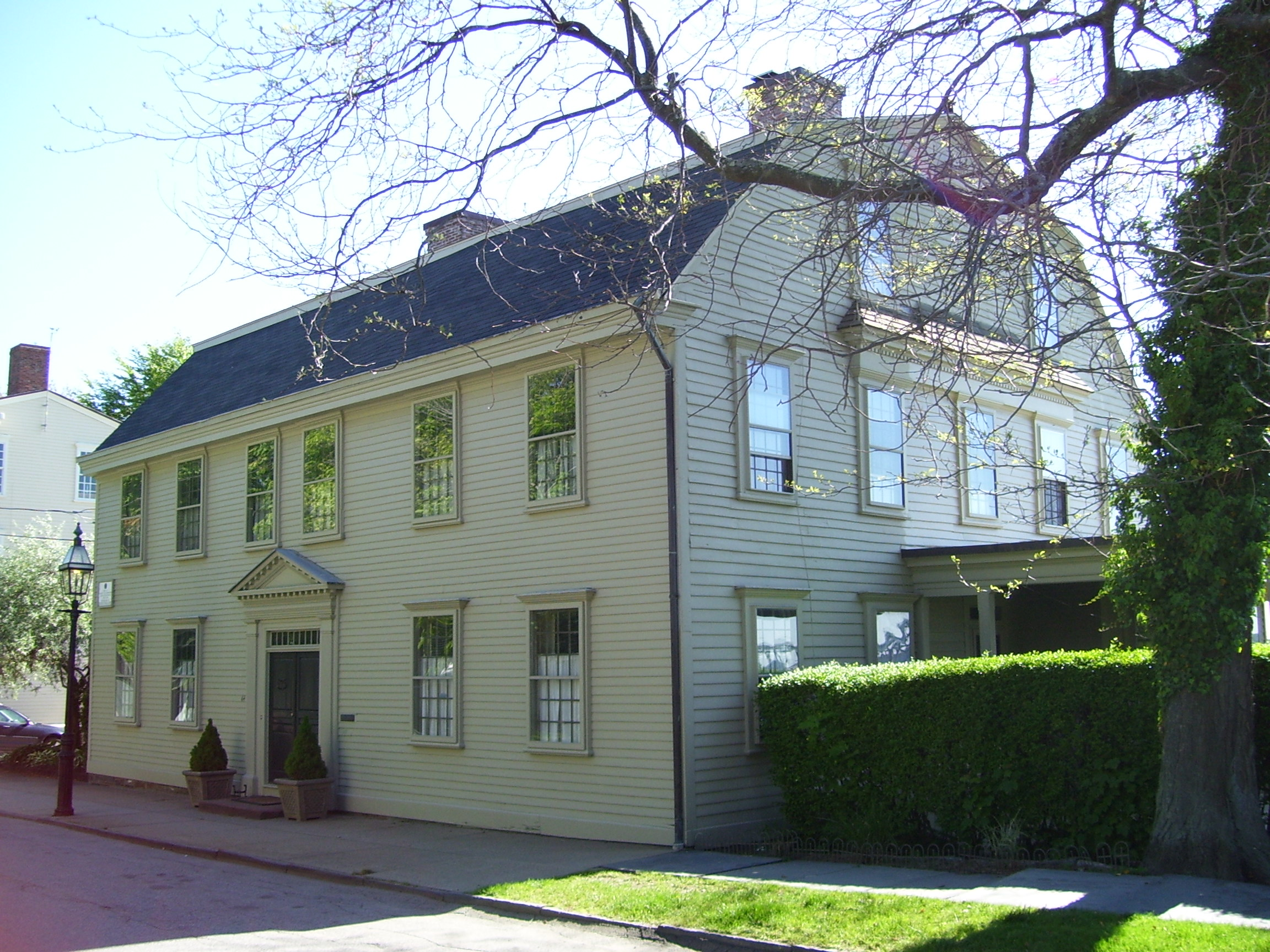
Home of Quaker Tom Robinson and his descendants since 1759, headquarters of French Vicomte de Noailles 1780-1781

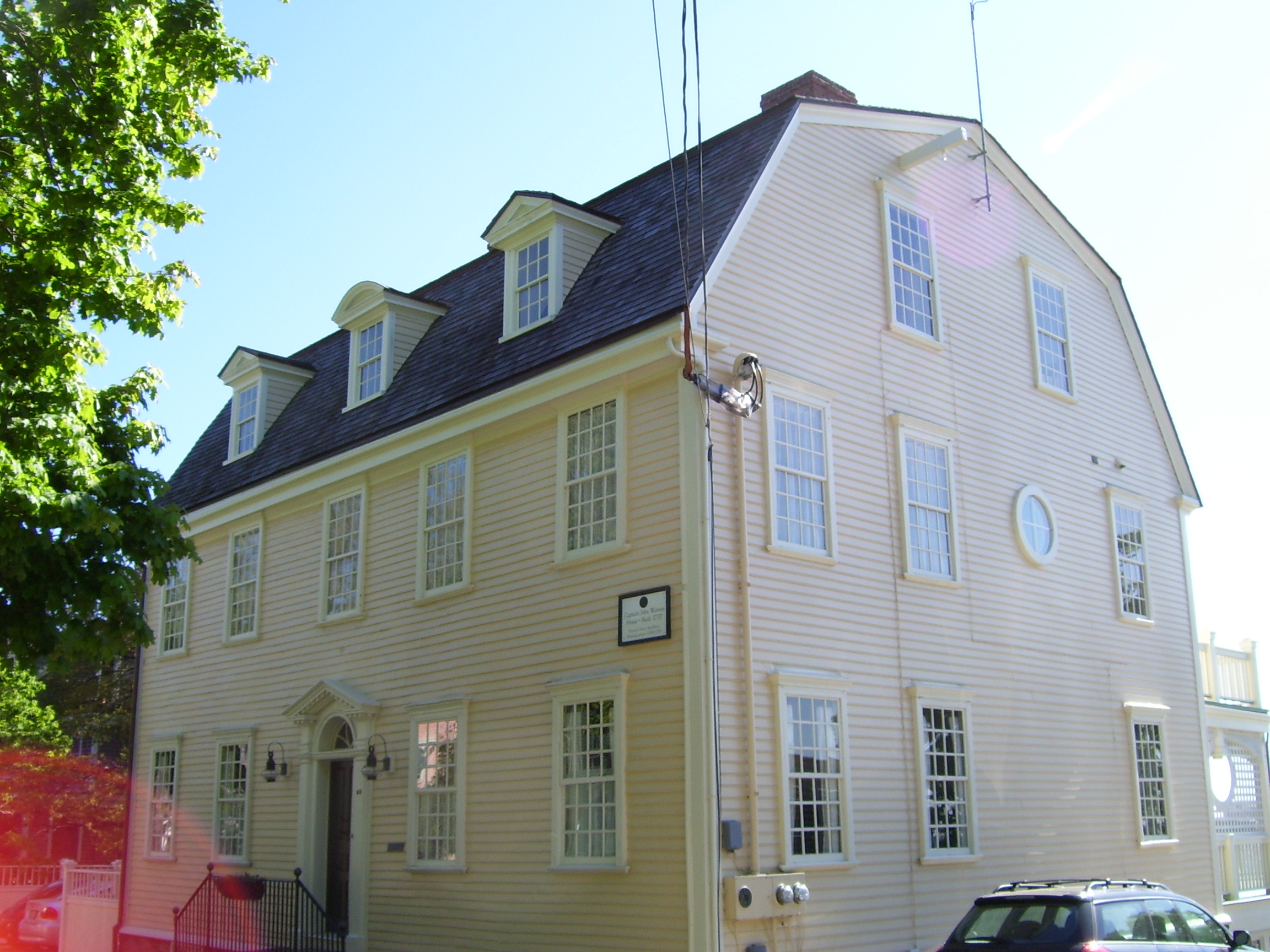
Home of Captain John Warren, built in 1737, Headquarters of French Artillery 1780-1781

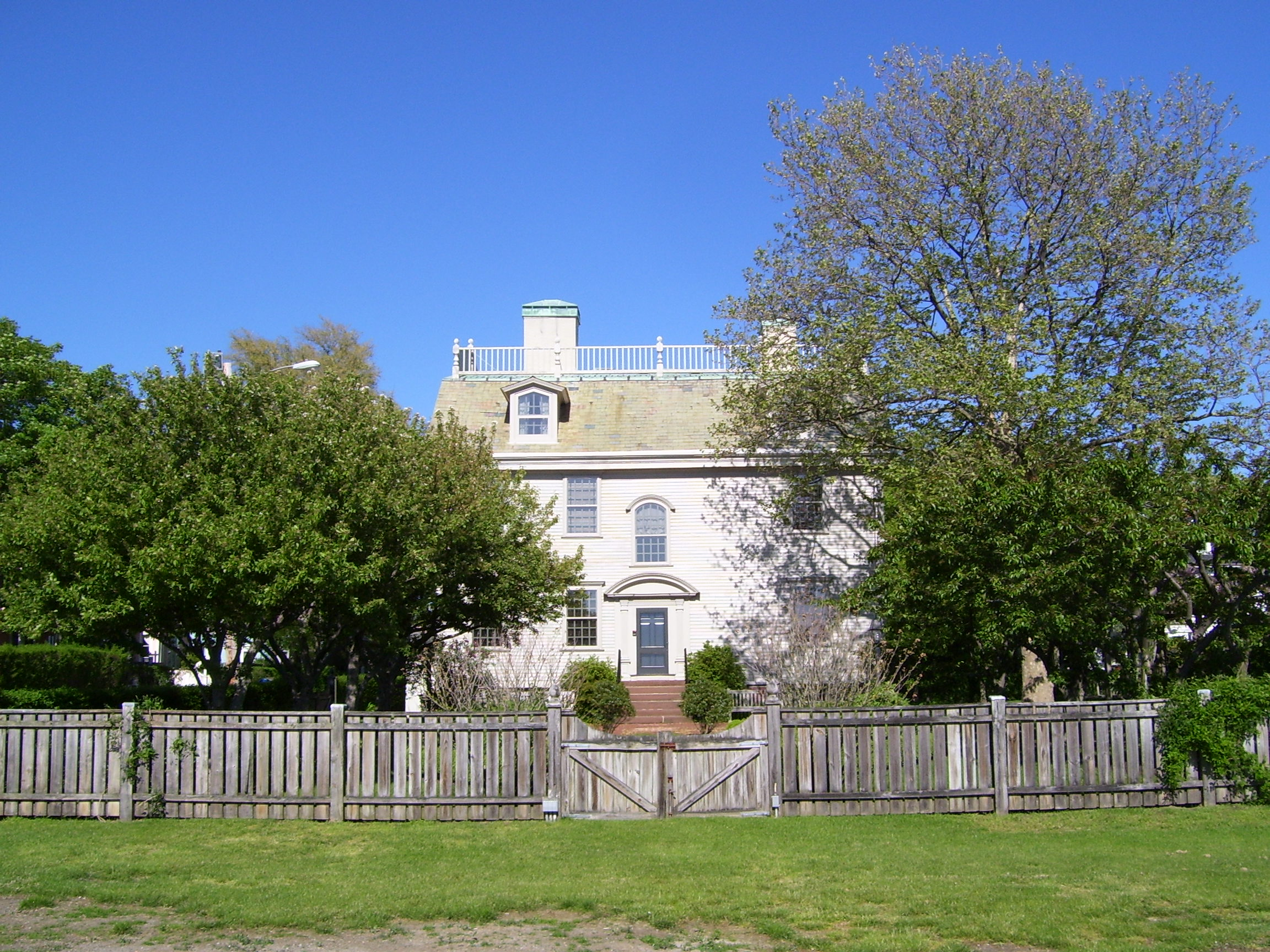
Hunter House

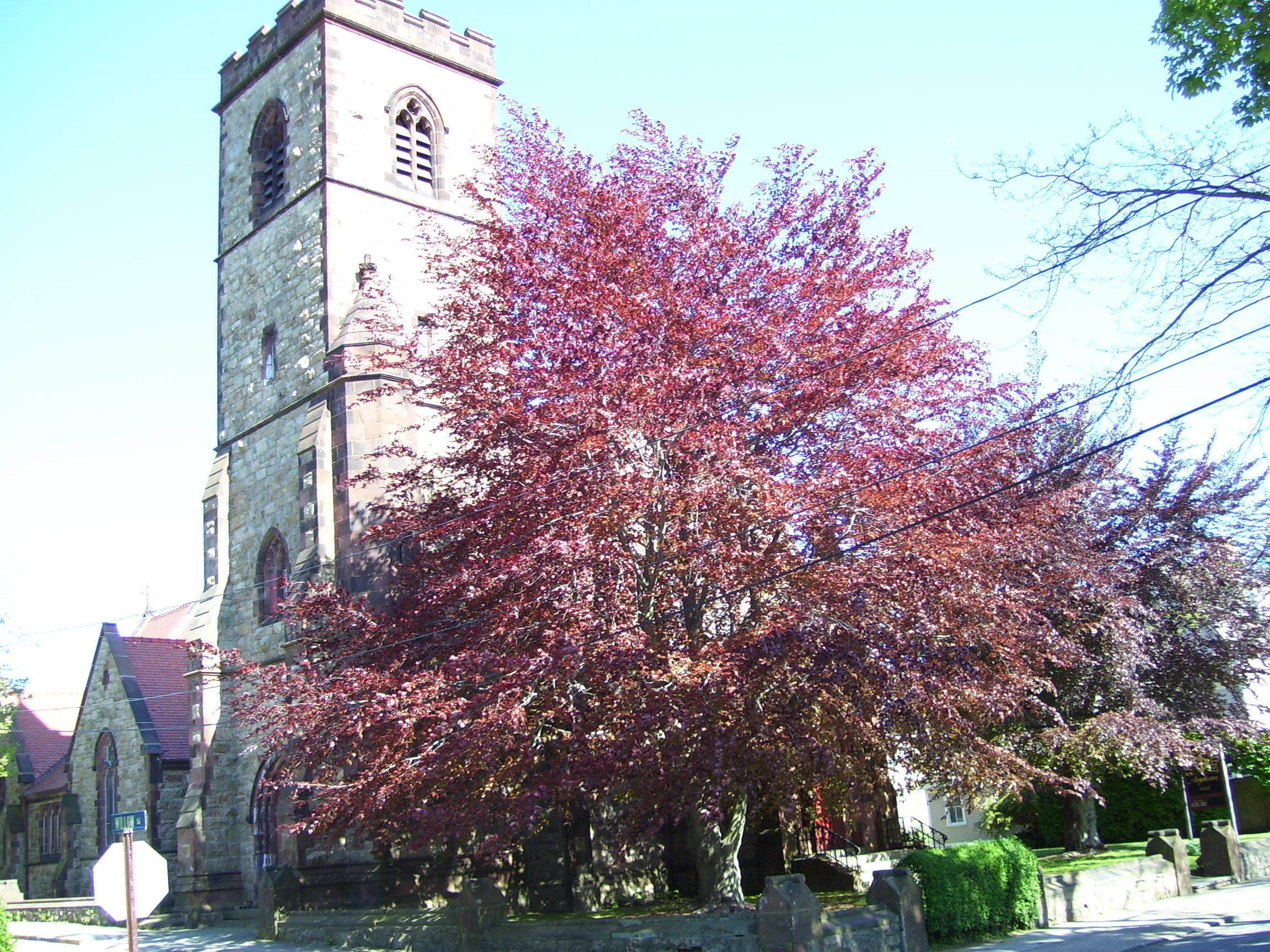
Saint John the Evangelist Church (Anglican) on Washington Street

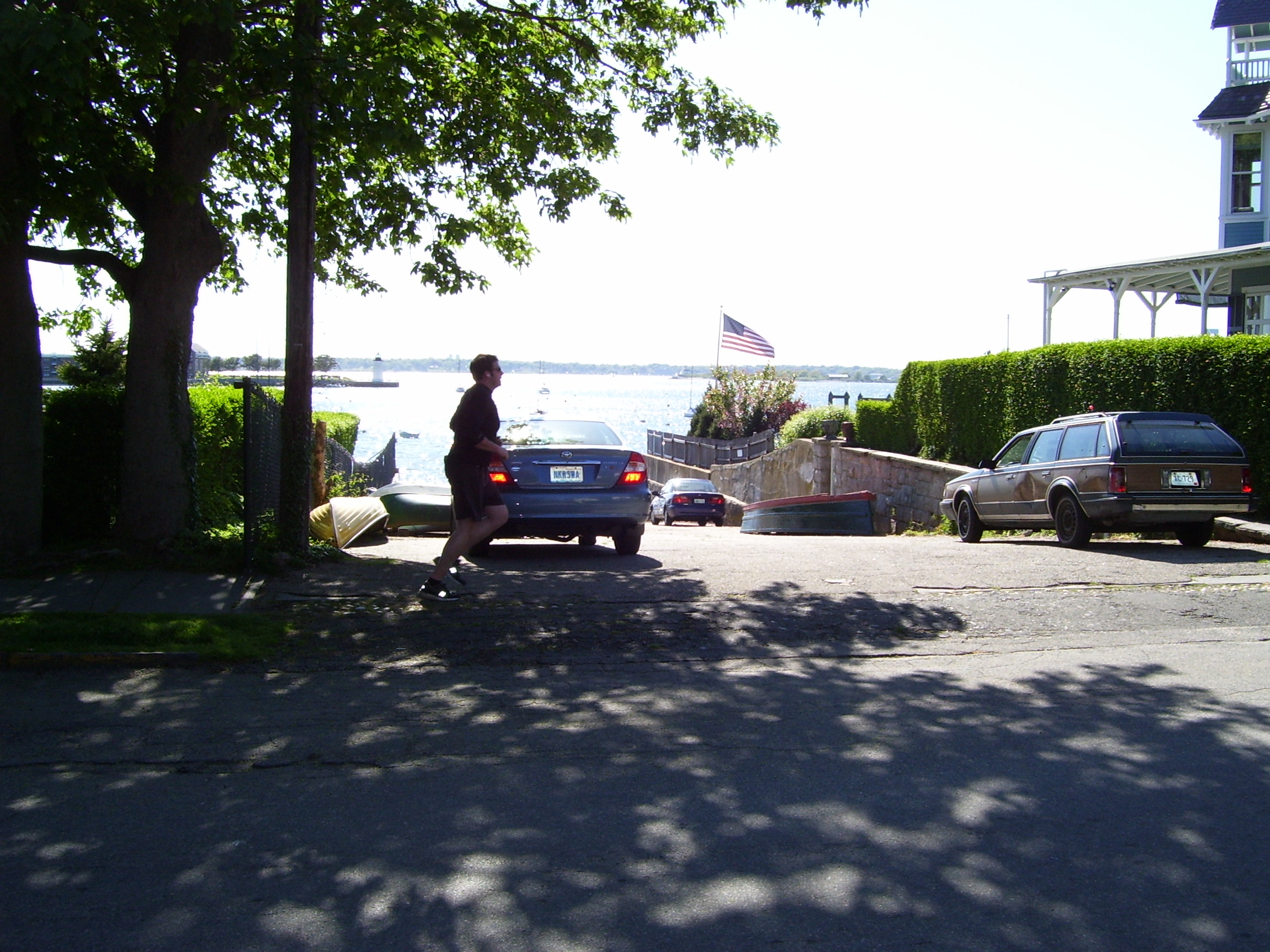
A public access driftway on Washington Street in The Point

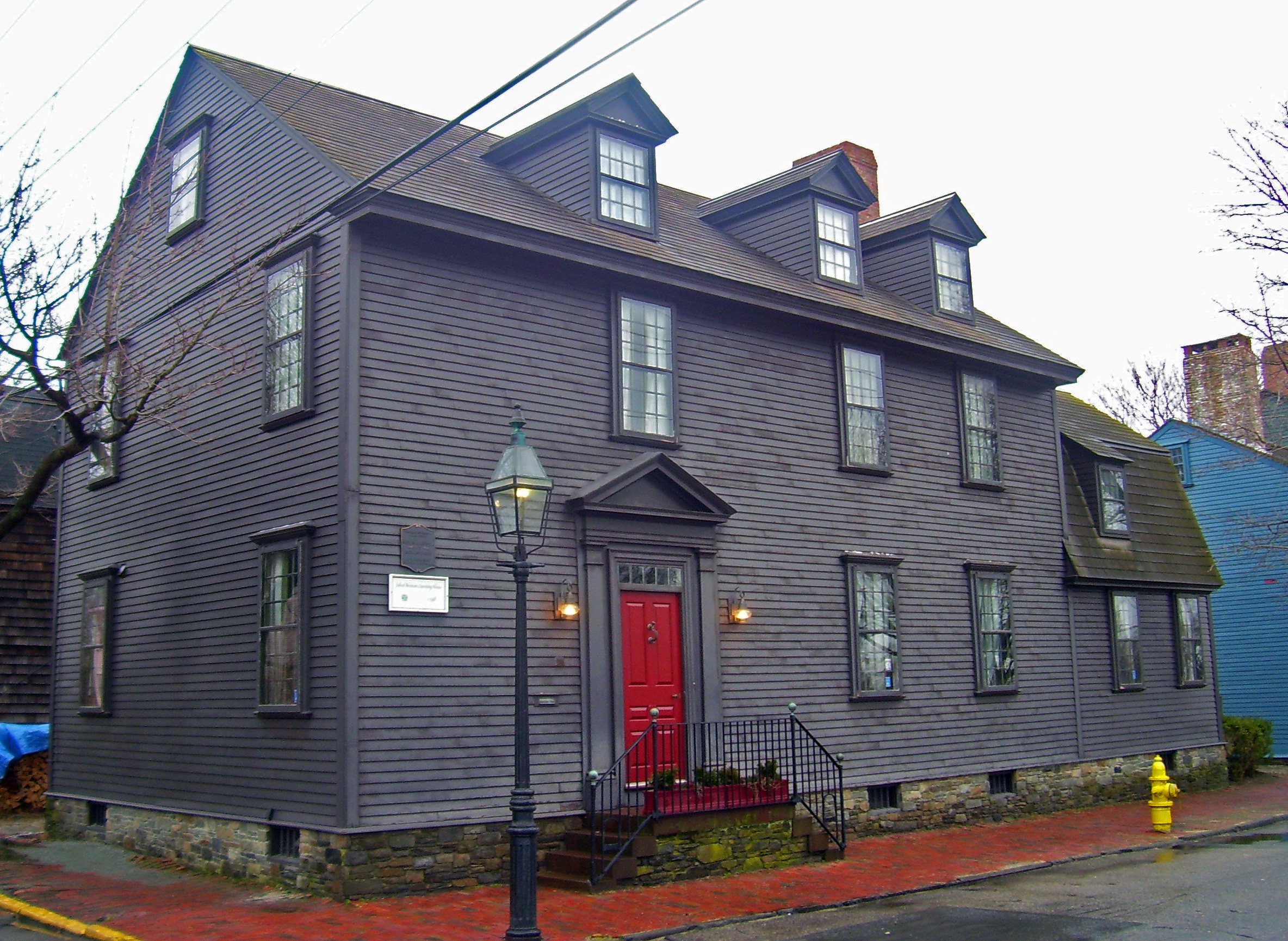
Washington Street house, home to a Quaker family

== References and external links ==
- Saint John the Evangelist Church in the Point
- Christine Dunn, "Newport’s the Point: A mingling of mansions, modest residences," Providence Journal, April 8, 2008
- Point pictures and info
