= Great Friends Meeting House =

Historic meetinghouse in Rhode Island, United States

- Friends Meetinghouse
- U.S. Historic district – Contributing property
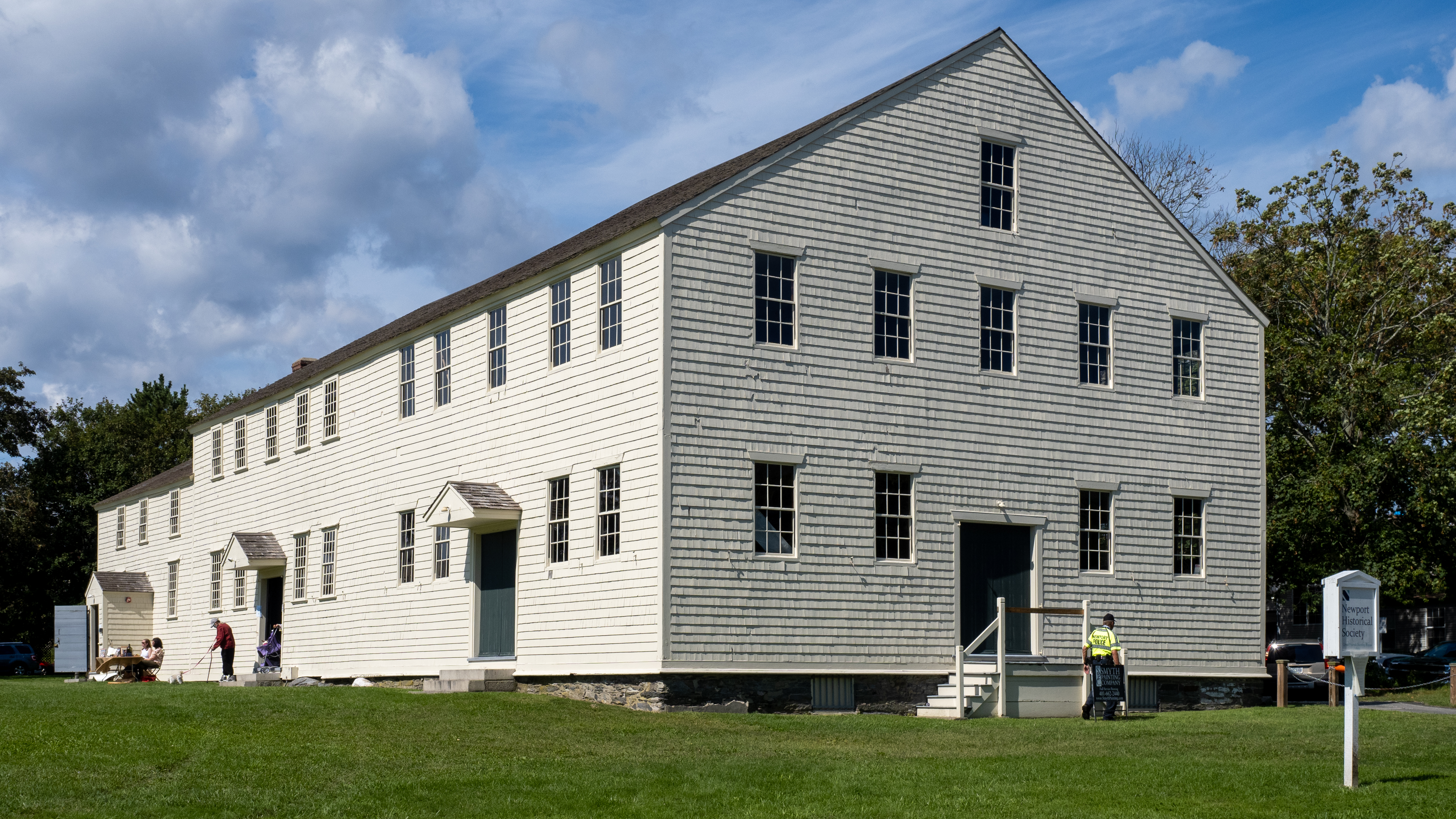
- Meetinghouse in 2021

- Location within Rhode Island Location within the United States
- Location: 30 Farewell St; Newport, Rhode Island
- Coordinates: 41°29′31.23″N 71°18′46.98″W
- Built: 1699
- Part of: Newport Historic District (Rhode Island) (ID68000001)
- Added to NRHP: November 24, 1968

Great Friends Meeting House is a meeting house of the Quakers built in 1699 in Newport, Rhode Island. The meeting house, which is part of the Newport Historic District, is currently open as a museum owned by the Newport Historical Society.

== Description ==
The meeting house is the oldest surviving house of worship in Rhode Island. In keeping with Quaker notions of "plain style" living, the building lacks adornments like pulpits, statuary, steeples, or stained glass. It features wide-plank floors, plain benches, a balcony, a beam ceiling, and a shingle exterior.

The original building measured two stories tall and about forty-five feet square, with a steeply pitched hip roof with a turret at the junction of the four roof slopes. Inside, massive framing timbers measure twelve inches square by forty-five feet long, supporting an open worship space with a second-floor gallery on three sides.

== History ==
The Quaker community in Newport largely controlled the culture and politics of the town in the 17th and 18th centuries, and many Quakers lived nearby in the historic "Easton's Point" section of Newport, where their houses have survived. The meeting house was built on land owned by Nicholas Easton who donated his land in the 1670s. It is likely Easton's house nearby on Farewell Street was used for the first Quaker meeting house before the current meeting house was built in 1699.

Upon its completion in 1699, the meeting house was the largest structure of any kind between Boston and New York.

Significant additions were made in 1730, 1807, 1857, and 1867 to accommodate the New England Yearly Meeting of Friends. The turret was removed in 1806.

The meeting house was used as a house of worship until the New England Yearly Meeting of Friends departed in 1905. The local African American community used the building as a community center until the 1970s when architect Orin M. Bullock restored the building, and in 1971 its owner Mrs. Sydney L. Wright donated the structure to the Newport Historical Society.

In 2005 a dendrochronology survey of the building's tree rings confirmed a 1699 construction date.

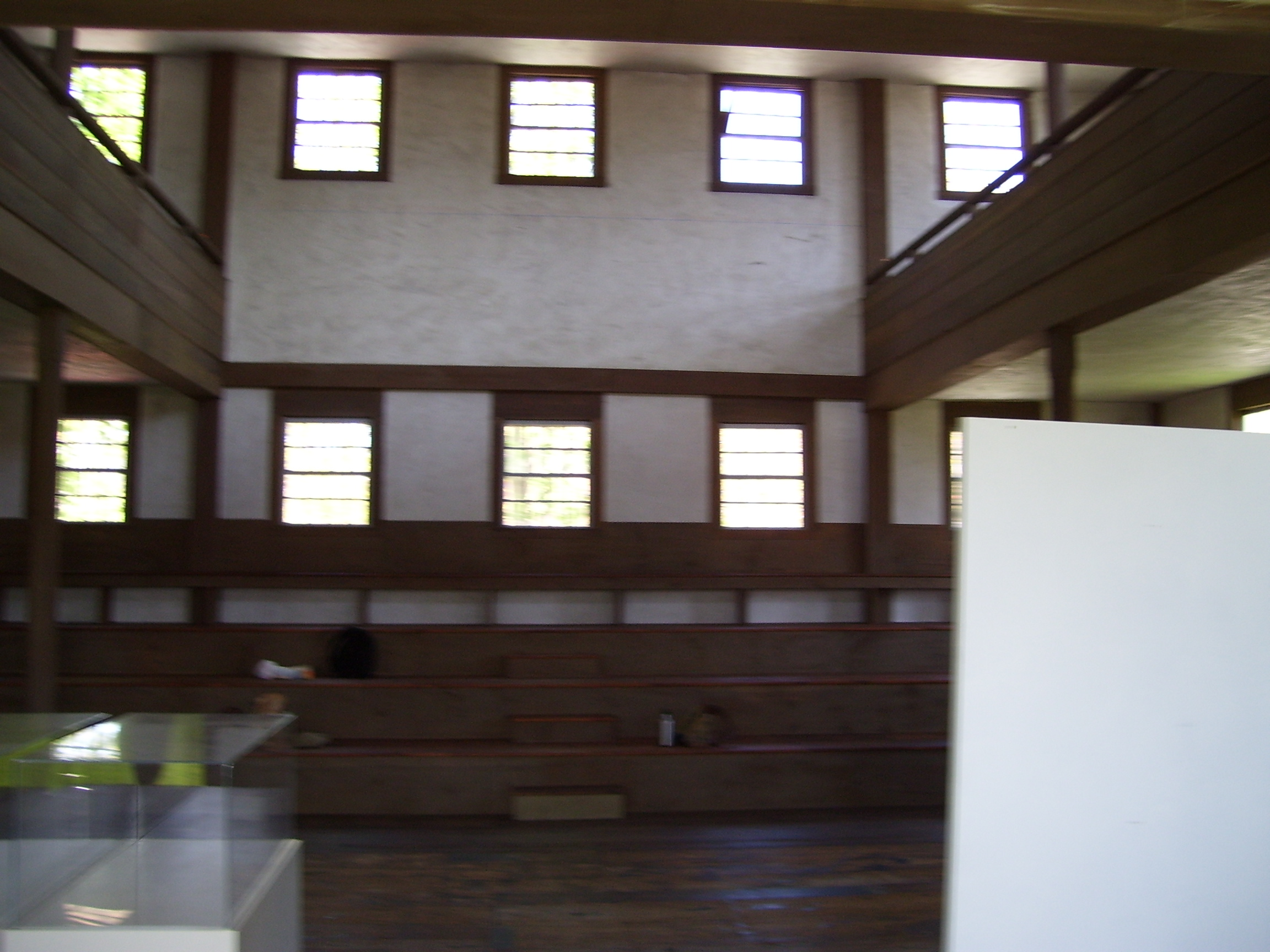
Interior

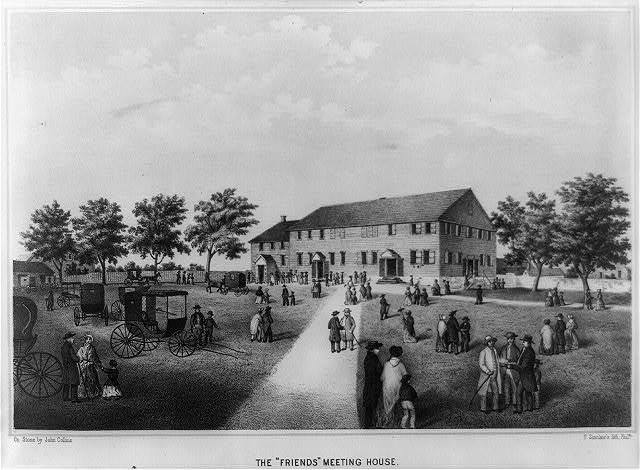
The Great Friends Meetinghouse pictured in 1852

== See also ==
- List of the oldest buildings in Rhode Island
- Oldest churches in the United States
- Portsmouth Friends Meetinghouse, Parsonage and Cemetery
