= Fort Greene (Newport, Rhode Island) =

Newport, Rhode Island military base

- Easton's Point, Newport, Rhode Island

Site information
- Type: Coastal Defense
- Owner: City of Newport, Battery Park
- Open to the public: yes

Location
- Location in Rhode Island
- Coordinates: 41°29′49″N 71°19′18″W

Site history
- Built: circa 1794
- Built by: United States Army
- In use: circa 1794-1815
- Materials: stone
- Demolished: circa 1820
- Battles/wars: War of 1812

Fort Greene in Newport, Rhode Island was a small fort built circa 1794 at Battery Park in the Point section of Newport, last active in the War of 1812. It was named for General Nathanael Greene of the Revolutionary War, who was born in Rhode Island. It was built as part of the First System of US seacoast fortifications circa 1794. The location is now Battery Park at Easton's Point (now usually called The Point), which was sometimes called North Point in the 18th century. It was on the site of a previous battery built in the American Revolution with state resources, called the North Battery. The seawall remains from Fort Greene and is curved at this point.

Fort Greene mounted approximately 12 guns and was intended to house a company of about 100 men, but was never completed. The fort was described in the Secretary of War's report on fortifications for December 1811 as "an elliptical stone battery... now in a state of ruin". Contemporary forts in Newport included the first Fort Adams and Fort Wolcott. In the War of 1812 the fort was garrisoned by the Newport Artillery. It appears to have been abandoned at some time after that war.

== See also ==
- Seacoast defense in the United States
