= Orin M. Bullock Jr. =

American architect and restorer (1905–1994)

- Born: 1905; California, United States
- Died: December 6, 1994 (aged 88–89); Centreville, Maryland, United States
- Education: Harvard Graduate School of Design
- Occupations: architect, professor, author
- Known for: historic preservation of old buildings

Orin M. Bullock Jr. (1905–1994) was an architect, professor, author, and historic preservationist. He was one of the original team members on the restoration of Colonial Williamsburg and wrote The Restoration Manual, a book detailing the steps and procedures that must be completed to properly restore old buildings, which is still considered the seminal book of its field.

== Biography ==
Bullock was born in California in 1905 and attended Harvard Graduate School of Design, graduating in 1927 with a degree in Architecture. His first major restoration project was helping to restore Colonial Williamsburg beginning in 1929, specifically the Benjamin Waller House which had been owned by a prominent lawyer and ancestor of President John Tyler. By the 1930s, the house was in need of substantive restoration. He became the director of architectural research there from 1953 to 1961. As part of his involvement with Colonial Williamsburg, Bullock portrayed Richard Henry Lee in Williamsburg: The Story of a Patriot (1957), the longest-running museum orientation film still in operation.

Other restoration projects Bullock worked on include the Waverly House in Howard County, Maryland, the Rogers Tavern in Perryville, Maryland, the William Paca House and Garden in Annapolis, Maryland, and the 17th-century Quaker Great Friends Meeting House in Newport, Rhode Island in order to better preserve the regional differentiation. He was a technical consultant for the Maryland Historical Trust, a Fellow of the American Institute of Architects, and taught architecture at the University of Maryland.

In 1961, he moved to Baltimore, Maryland and six years later was appointed chief of property rehabilitation for the Baltimore Urban Renewal and Housing Agency. Bullock restored a Bolton Hill townhouse 1432 John St. and made it his home.

In 1966, Bullock wrote The Restoration Manual, which is still in print and is considered to be a cornerstone in the field of architectural restoration.

He died at age 88 of sepsis in Centreville, Maryland on December 6, 1994.

== Works ==
- The Restoration Manual: An illustrated guide to the preservation and restoration of old buildings (1966, Norwalk, Connecticut, Silvermine Publishers Inc.)
- An archival collection of Bullock's papers, drawings, journals, and photographs entitled the Orin M. Bullock, Jr. papers, 1920-1986 are held by the University of Maryland, College Park.

== Filmography ==
- Bullock portrayed Richard Henry Lee in Williamsburg: The Story of a Patriot (1957)
