= Paca House and Garden =

Historic house in Maryland, United States

- U.S. National Register of Historic Places
- U.S. National Historic Landmark
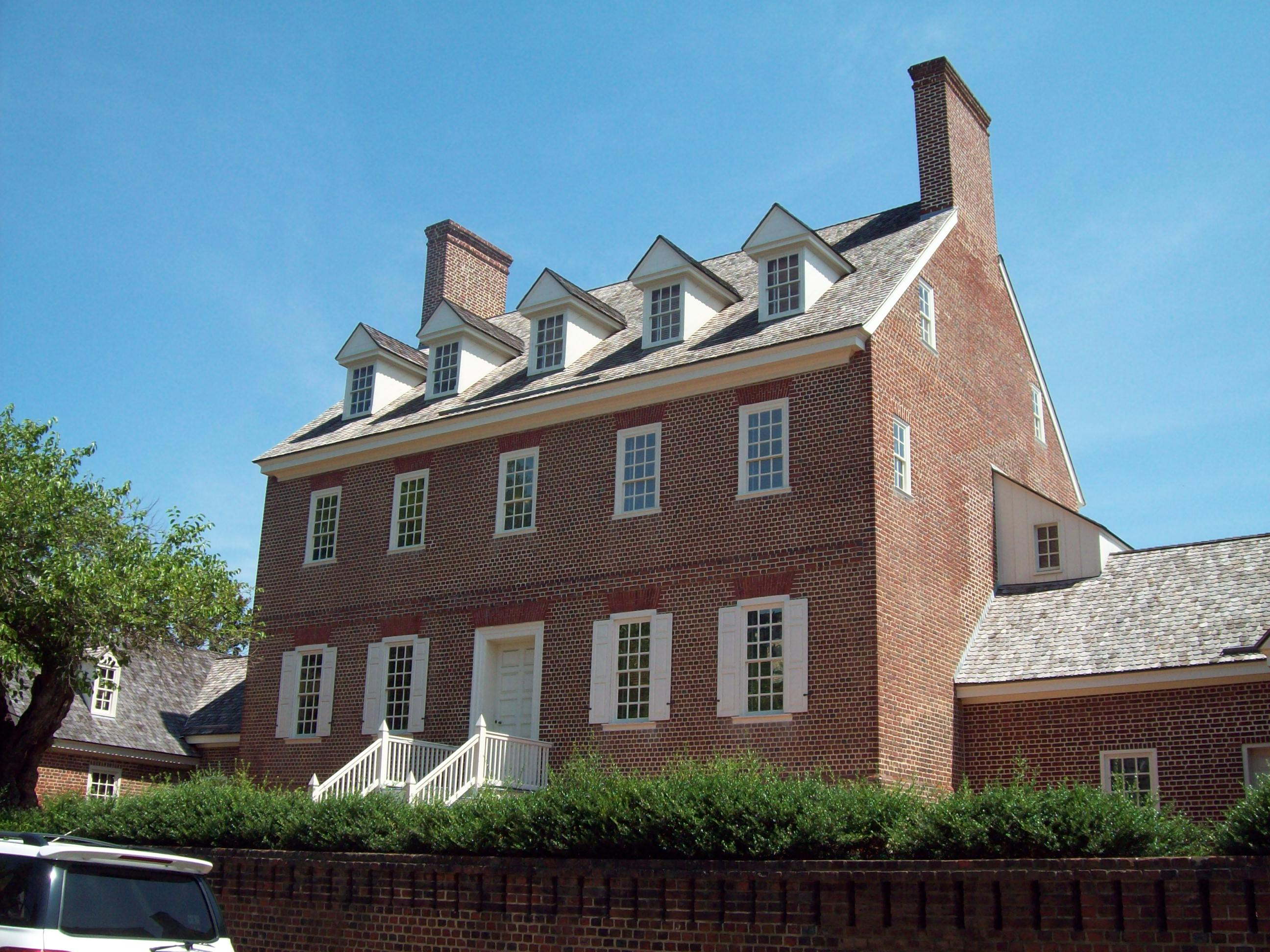
- William Paca House, July 2009

- Location within Maryland Location within the United States
- Location: Annapolis, Maryland
- Coordinates: 38°58′46.6″N 76°29′16.3″W
- Built: 1763
- Architect: William Paca
- Architectural style: Georgian
- NRHP reference No.: 71000364

Significant dates
- Added to NRHP: November 11, 1971
- Designated NHL: November 11, 1971

The William Paca House (at one time known as Carvel Hall) is an 18th-century Georgian mansion in Annapolis, Maryland, United States. Founding Father William Paca was a signatory of the Declaration of Independence and a three-term Governor of Maryland. The house was built between 1763 and 1765 and its architecture was largely designed by Paca himself. The 2-acre (8,100 m^{2}) walled garden, which includes a two-story summer house, has been restored to its original state.

The William Paca House and Garden was declared a National Historic Landmark in 1971.

The original one-story office and kitchen pavilions, and their connecting hyphens, were altered in the 19th century with the house's conversion to a hotel, by a second story added to the hyphens and the west wing. These changes have since been reversed, and the building approximates its original outward appearance, both inside and out.

== History ==
In 1780, Paca sold the house to Thomas Jenings, the attorney general of Maryland.

=== Carvel Hall Hotel ===
The house and grounds were eventually acquired by the Annapolis Hotel Corporation, and the house became the lobby and conference rooms for the Carvel Hall Hotel, which was constructed in the garden immediately to the rear. The hotel opened in 1901 with two-hundred guest rooms. But, by 1964, a mixed-use development was proposed for the site that would have demolished the house and the hotel, putting high rises in its place.

=== Restoration ===
After the plans to demolish Carvel Hall became public, the house was acquired by Historic Annapolis, Inc. (later the Historic Annapolis Foundation, or HAF), and the surrounding property (garden) was acquired by the State of Maryland in 1965. The additions were removed in 1966-67 by architects including Orin M. Bullock Jr., and ownership was transferred to the Maryland Historical Trust. The property is administered by Historic Annapolis Foundation, and is open to the public for guided tours of the house and self-guided garden year round.

== Description ==
The Paca House is a Georgian five-part house. The brick structure comprises a central 2 1/2-story block on an elevated basement, flanked by symmetrical 1 1/2-story end pavilions, connected to the central structure by 1 1/2-story hyphens. The interior is a center hall plan with two rooms on either side of the hall. Original woodwork remains only in the central hall, stair hall and the west parlor, including the stair's original Chinese Chippendale balustrade.

== See also ==
- Hammond-Harwood House
- Brice House
- Chase-Lloyd House
- Whitehall (Annapolis, Maryland)
- Tulip Hill
- List of National Historic Landmarks in Maryland
- National Register of Historic Places listings in Anne Arundel County, Maryland

== Gallery ==
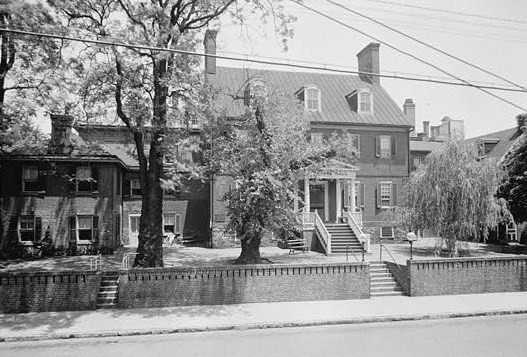
Paca House, HABS Photo, June 1936

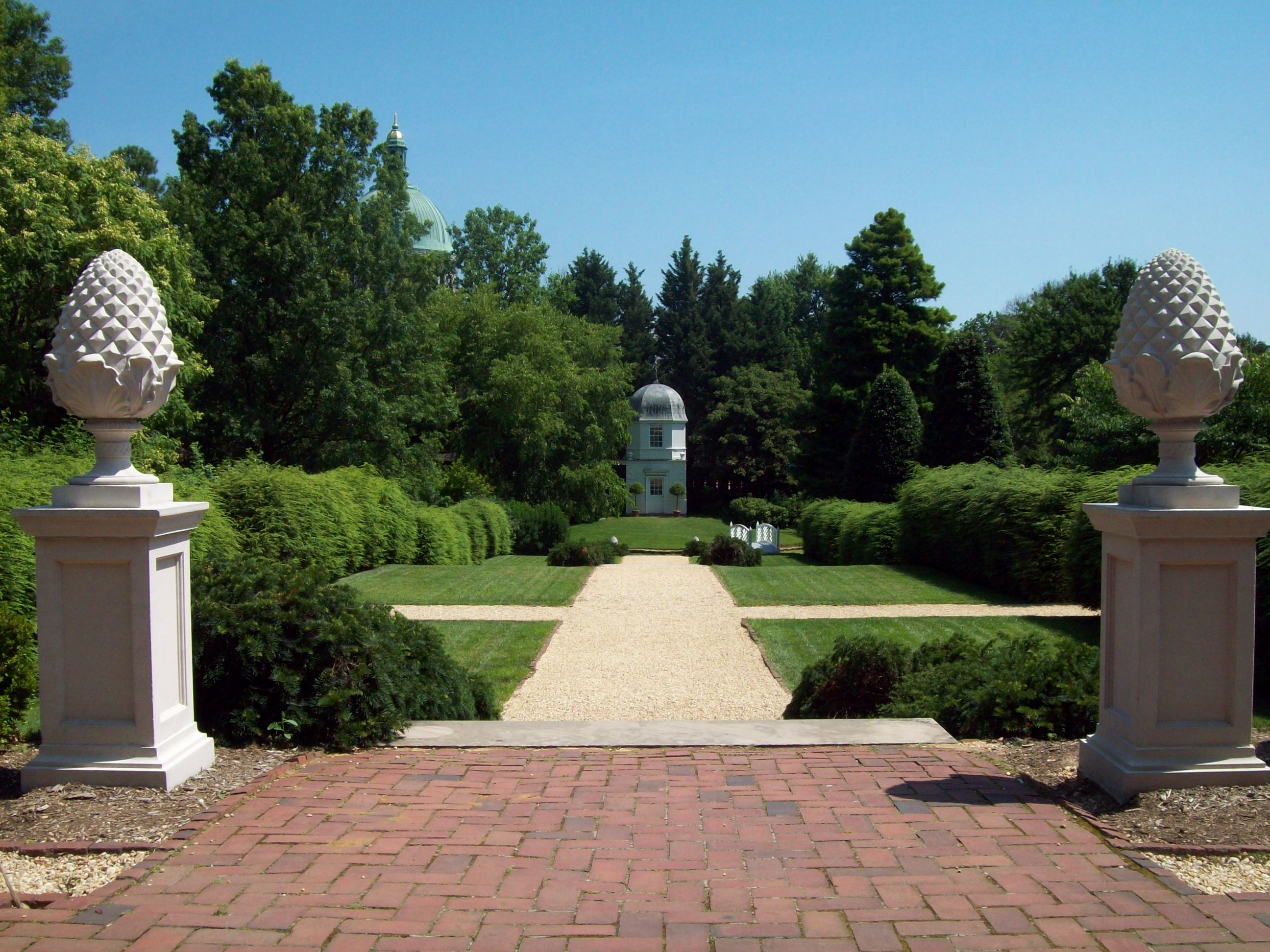
Paca House garden, view of the main walk, July 2009

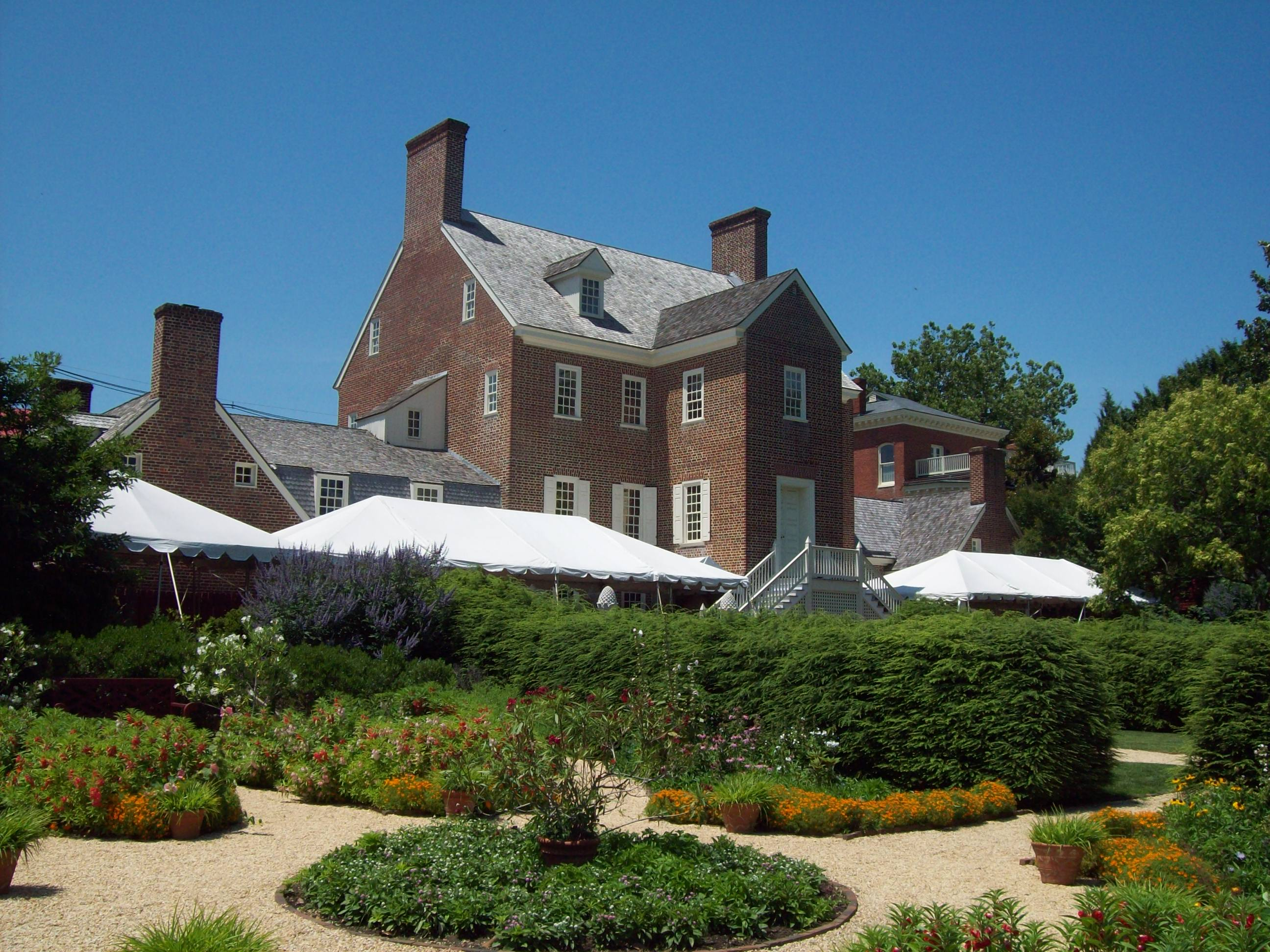
Paca House garden, view of house from the garden, July 2009
