= Goddard and Townsend =

Cabinet makers

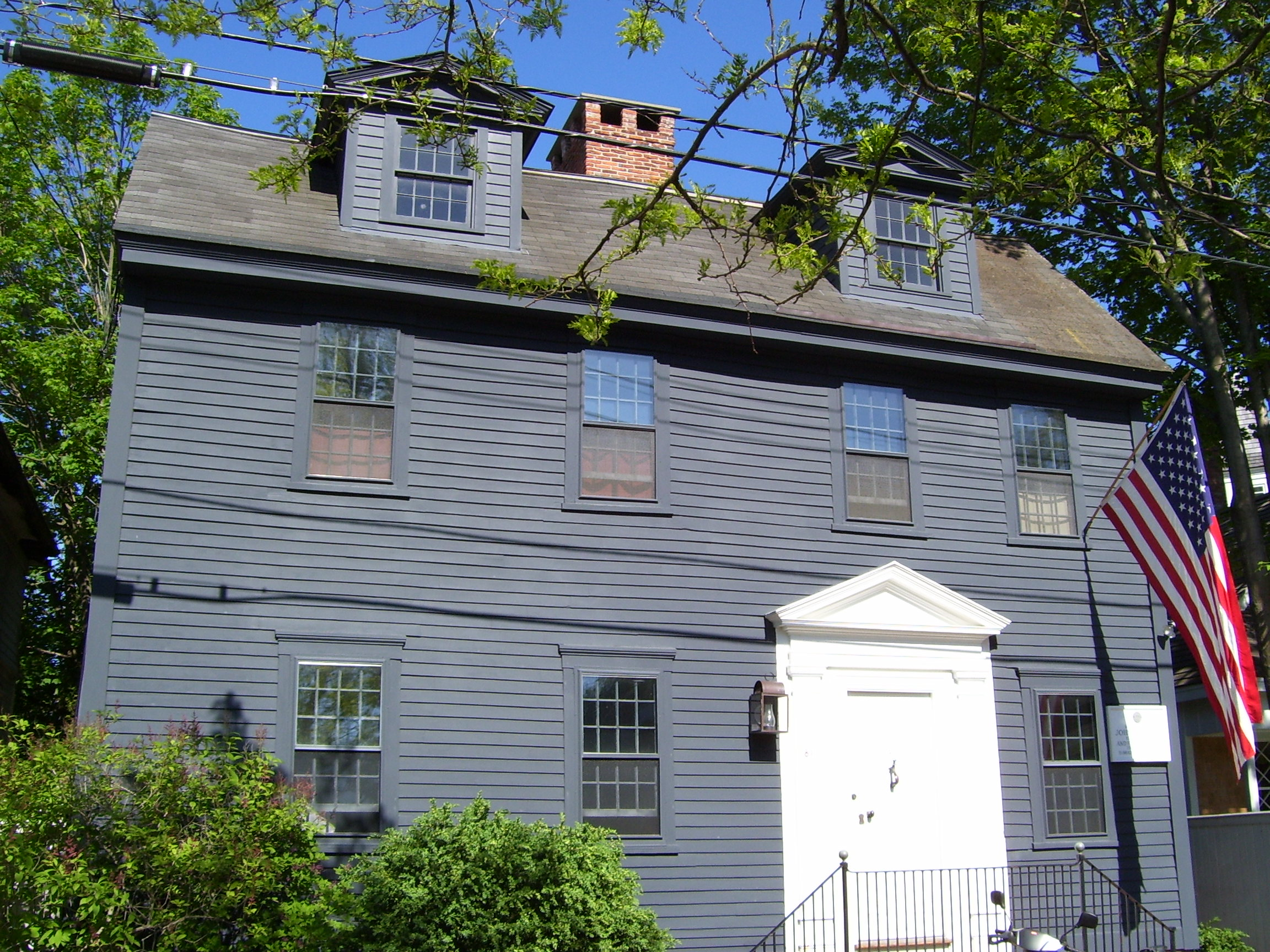
18th century home of the Goddard family on Second Street in the Easton's Point neighborhood of Newport, Rhode Island

Goddard-Townsend set of drawers with shells

John Townsend label from an 18th-century clock

The Goddard and Townsend families of Newport lend their name to an extensive body of New England furniture associated with Newport, Rhode Island in the second half of the 18th century.

== Family of artisans ==
The Townsend and Goddard families were two Quaker families that were part of a large cabinetmaking community centered in The Point neighborhood of Newport, a predominantly Quaker neighborhood. The founders of this cabinetmaking dynasty immigrated to Newport from other New England towns. Christopher Townsend (1701–1787) and Job Townsend (1699–1765) of Oyster Bay, New York, came to Newport in 1707 with their parents Solomon Townsend and Catherine (Almy) Townsend. Both brothers would become cabinetmakers in Newport. Carpenter and cabinetmaker Daniel Goddard (1697–1764) was born in Jamestown, Rhode Island to Henry Goddard and Mary (Howland) Goddard. He moved from Jamestown first to Dartmouth, Massachusetts, before settling in Newport by 1727.

The second generation of Newport cabinetmakers from these families are perhaps the best known. John Townsend (1732–1809) was the son of Christopher Townsend and Patience (Easton) Townsend. He would marry Philadelphia Feke (1742–1802), daughter of famed portrait painter Robert Feke. John Goddard (1723/4-1785) was the son of Daniel Goddard and apprentice of Job Townsend. He married Job's daughter Hannah Townsend (1728–1804).

Twenty-one members of successive generations of these two intermarried families worked as cabinetmakers over a period of 120 years, selling their products not only in New England but also in the coastal trade and in the West Indies.

== Furniture ==
The furniture associated with the Goddard and Townsend families is identified by a number of unique features. The so-called Block-and-shell motif, a block-front topped by a carved shell in alternating concave and convex pattern, is one of the key features. However, this alone is not proof of Goddard or Townsend origin- recently rediscovered cabinetmakers such as Benjamin Baker (1734–1822) of Newport or Grindal Rawson (1719–1803) of Providence are also known to have used the carved shell pattern when constructing case furniture. Newport furniture of this school is also associated with a distinct ball and claw foot, in which there is an open space carved between the talon and ball. Such a form is thought to be unique to Newport, though not unique to the Goddard or Townsend families.

== Notable works ==
A single mahogany secretary bookcase made by Christopher Townsend (John's father) in 1740 sold at auction in New York for $8.25 million. John Goddard made a famous six-shell desk-bookcase for Providence merchant Nicholas Brown, Sr. It was sold by the Brown family in 1989, for $12.1 million — a record for a piece of American furniture at auction. The Museum of Fine Arts, Houston, Philadelphia Museum of Art, Metropolitan Museum of Art, Boston Museum of Fine Art, Yale University Art Gallery, Rhode Island School of Design Museum of Art and Preservation Society of Newport County own works of Goddard-Townsend.

== References and external links ==
- Rhode Island Furniture Archive at the Yale University Art Gallery
- Billy Van Siclen, "The Townsend Touch: Newport's furniture-design revolutionary finds a showcase at the Met in New York," Providence Journal, Sunday, May 22, 2005
- Redwood Library Records of the Goddards and Townsends
- Townsend Family info

== See also ==
- List of furniture designers.
