= Timeline of Newport, Rhode Island =

Coordinates: 41.488°N 71.313°W

Timeline of Newport, Rhode Island.

== 17th century ==
- 1639 - William Coddington settles.
- 1643 - First Society of Friends established (approximate date).
- 1644
  - Newport becomes part of the Colony of Rhode Island and Providence Plantations.
  - Name changed from Aquidneck
  - United Baptist Church founded.
- 1647 - Friends' Burial Ground established.
- 1654 - Thames Street laid out.
- 1656 - Second Baptist Church established.
- 1658 - Jews welcomed as settlers.
- 1663 - Easton's windmill built.
- 1673 - White Horse Tavern enlarged into a tavern.
- 1675 - Clifton Burying Ground established.
- 1677
  - Jewish Cemetery dedicated.
  - Stone mill in operation (approximate date).
- 1681 - Custom-house established.
- 1690 - Town House built.
- 1695 - First Congregational Church established.
- 1696 — The first recorded slave ship, the "Sea Flower," arrives in Newport carrying 47 captives, 14 of whom are sold in Newport.
- 1697 - Mumford house (residence) built (approximate date).
- 1699 - Great Friends Meeting House built.

== 18th century ==
- Early 1700s — Newport becomes a major hub of the triangular slave trade
- 1703 - Fort built on Goat Island (approximate date).
- 1705 - John Stevens stonecarving shop in business.
- 1723 - July 19: Pirates hanged on Gravelly point.
- 1726 - Trinity Church built.
- 1727 - James Franklin sets up printing press.
- 1730
  - Literary and Philosophical Society organized.
  - Seventh Day Baptist Meeting House built.
  - White Horse Tavern in business.
  - Population: 4,640.
- 1732 - Rhode Island Gazette newspaper begins publication.
- 1733 - Organ installed in Trinity Church.
- 1735 - Clarke Street Meeting House built.
- 1740 - January: Snow storm.
- 1741
  - State House built.
  - Artillery Company of Newport chartered.
- 1743 - Middletown separates from Newport.
- 1746 - Almshouse built.
- 1747 - Redwood Library established.
- 1749 - Lighthouse built.
- 1750 - Fire company organized.
- 1752
  - Marine society established.
  - Hunter's Dispensary in business.
- 1755 - Aaron Lopez (merchant) in business.
- 1758 - Newport Mercury newspaper begins publication.
- 1760 - Francis Malbone House and John Tillinghast House built.
- 1761
  - Jewish Club organized.
  - Douglass travelling theatre troupe performs.
- 1762 - Brick Market built.
- 1763 - Touro Synagogue and Granary built.
- 1764 - Shots fired at HMS St John.
- 1765
  - June: Demonstration against impressment.
  - August 27: Protest against Stamp Act.
- 1774 - Population: 9,209.
- 1776
  - December 8: British occupation begins.
  - Population: 5,229.
- 1778
  - August 29: Battle of Rhode Island
  - December: Snow storm.
- 1779 - October 25: British occupation ends.
- 1780
  - July 12: French troops arrive.
  - Charles Feke apothecary in business.
  - Clarke Cooke House built.
  - Free African Union Society founded
- 1781
  - March 6: George Washington visits Rochambeau in Newport.
  - French troops depart.
- 1784
  - City incorporated.
  - George Hazard becomes mayor.
  - Goat Island sold to U.S. military.
- 1787 - Town government resumes.
- 1788 - Brissot de Warville finds "houses falling to ruin and grass growing in the public square" and Population: "less than 6000".
- 1790
  - August 17: George Washington visits Newport.
  - Population: 6,716.
- 1792 - Newport Association of Mechanics and Manufacturers incorporated.
- 1799
  - Fort Adams built.
  - Yellow fever epidemic.

== 19th century ==
- 1803 - Newport National Bank incorporated.
- 1805 - First Methodist Episcopal Church established.
- 1810 - Spencer's variety store in business.
- 1811
  - Hammond's Circulating Library in business.
  - Samuel Whitehorne House built.
- 1814 - Sherman & Co. grocers in business.
- 1815 - September 23: Gale.
- 1819
  - Newport Asylum built on Coasters' Harbor Island.
  - Savings Bank of Newport incorporated.
- 1823 - Newport Harbor Lighthouse built.
- 1828 - Mechanics' Library established.
- 1831 - Newport Steam Factory built.
- 1832 - Cozzens carpet shop in business.
- 1833 - June 19: Andrew Jackson visits Newport.
- 1834 - Zion Episcopal Church built.
- 1835
  - Davis' Family Bakery in business.
  - Perry Cotton Mill built.
- 1837 - Coddington cotton mill built.
- 1838 - Armory built.
- 1839 - Kingscote (mansion) built.
- 1845
  - Ocean House hotel in business.
  - Old Colony Railroad begins
- 1846
  - The Newport Daily News begins publication.
  - First Baptist Church building and Van Zandt house constructed.
- 1847
  - Central Baptist Chursh established.
  - Hazard grocery and Langley & Bennett in business.
- 1851 - Beechwood (mansion) built.
- 1852
  - Street lighting by gas lamp begins (approximate date).
  - Chateau-sur-Mer (residence) built.
  - St. Mary's Church completed.
- 1853
  - City incorporated again.
  - Robert B. Cranston becomes mayor.
  - Church of the Holy Name of Mary built.
- 1854
  - Newport Historical Society and Newport Reading Room founded.
  - Sisters of Mercy convent built.
  - Lighthouse commissioned on Lime Rock.
- 1855 - Touro Park established.
- 1857 - United Congregational Church built.
- 1859 - August 23: Reunion of the Sons and Daughters of Newport.
- 1860 - Chepstow (mansion) built.
- 1861 - Kaull & Anthony grocers in business.
- 1862 - Nason upholstery in business.
- 1863 - School house built on Willow Street.
- 1864
  - Old Colony and Newport Railway begins operating.
  - Shiloh Baptist Church organized.
- 1865
- Newport Free Library and Reading Room established, first public library in Rhode Island.
- Young Men's Christian Organization formed with the goal to gather books for a library.
- Newport Light Infantry formed.
  - Scott grocery in business.
- 1866 - Atlantic House roller skating rink opens.
- 1867
  - Young Men's Christian Organization disbanded.
  - Newport Free Library and Reading Room Incorporated.
  - Frasch confectionery in business.
  - Opera house established.
- 1869
- People's Library Incorporated
  - U.S. Naval Torpedo Station established on Goat Island.
  - August: Ulysses S. Grant visits Newport.
- 1870
  - Rose Island Light built.
  - The People's Free Library, later the Newport Public Library opens at its new location on Thames Street on May 4 completing the merger with the Newport Free Library and Reading Room.
  - Newport & Wickford Railroad and Steamboat Company organized.
  - Population - 12,521.
- 1871 - Newport Manufacturing Company mill built.
- 1873
  - Newport Hospital opens.
  - Rogers High School founded.
- 1874 - Ward's Circulating Library in business.
- 1875 - Population: 14,028.
- 1876 - International Polo Cup match held.
- 1878
  - Young Men's Christian Association re-organized.
  - King & McLeod (dry goods) and Marshall & Flynn (printer) in business.
- 1880
  - Channing Memorial Church and Newport Casino built.
  - May 30: The League of American Wheelmen is formed in Newport
  - Population - 15,693.
- 1881
  - City water system authorized.
  - Newport Skating Rink opens.
  - Tennis tournament begins at Newport Casino.
  - Groff pharmacy in business.
- 1882
  - Couzens and Bull telephone exchange in business.
  - Free Chapel of St. John the Evangelist established.
  - Vinland Estate built.
- 1883 - Isaac Bell House built.
- 1884
  - Naval War College established.
  - July 4: Reunion of the Sons and Daughters of Newport.
- 1885
  - St. Joseph's Church established.
  - Morton Park established (approximate date).
  - Stone Tower restored.
- 1888 - Carr bookseller and Hass florist in business.
- 1889 - Electric trolley begins operating.
- 1890's - Bailey's Beach founded.
- 1891 - Rockhurst (residence) built.
- 1892 - Marble House, Ochre Court, and Rough Point built.
- 1893
  - Newport Country Club established.
  - Old Colony Railroad stops operations.
- 1894 - Belcourt Castle (residence) built.
- 1895 - National Open Golf Championship held at Newport Country Club.
  - The Breakers (residence) built.
- 1896 - St. George's School established near Newport.
- 1898 - Vernon Court (residence) built.
- 1899 - September 7: Automobile parade.
- 1900 - Rhode Island state capital relocates to Providence.

== 20th century ==
- 1901
  - The Elms (residence) built.
  - TJ Brown in business.
- 1902 - Newport Historical Society Museum building and Oelrichs House constructed.
- 1905
  - Civic League formed.
  - Population: 25,039.
- 1908 - Cardines Field baseball stadium is opened.
- 1910 - Population: 27,149.
- 1912 - Art Association of Newport organized.
- 1915 - Miramar (mansion) built.
- 1919
  - Seamen's Church Institute founded.
  - U.S. Navy sex scandal.
- 1923 - Rhode Island Route 114 designated.
- 1925
  - Seaview Terrace (residence) built.
  - March 25: A fire destroys the third floor of City Hall; Newport's fire chief dies in the blaze
- 1926 - Hotel Viking (hotel) opens.
- 1926 - Courthouse built on Washington Square.
- 1930 - America's Cup yacht race relocates to Newport.
- 1934 - Salve Regina University chartered.
- 1937 - Population: 27,612.
- 1938 - September: Hurricane.
- 1942 - Naval Academy Preparatory School relocates to Newport.
- 1946 - United Baptist Church established.
- 1948 - WADK radio (1540 AM) begins broadcasting as WRJM. Call Letters changed to WADK in November 1953.
- 1950 - Naval Justice School relocates to Newport.
- 1953 - September 12: wedding of John Fitzgerald Kennedy and Jacqueline Bouvier at St. Mary's Church.
- 1954
  - Newport Jazz Festival begins.
  - Tennis Hall of Fame established.
- 1958 - President Eisenhower establishes his summer White House at the Fort Adams Commandants House.
- 1959
  - Newport Folk Festival begins.
  - Rovensky Park established.
- 1960 - Population: 47,049.
- 1964 - Newport State Airport (Rhode Island) in operation.
- 1965
  - Fort Adams State Park established.
  - Folk singer Bob Dylan performs a controversial but influential electric folk-rock concert at the Newport Folk Festival.
- 1969
  - Newport Bridge opens.
  - Newport Folk Festival held for the final time before a 16-year hiatus.
- 1972 - Newport Jazz Festival moves to New York City
- 1976 - Brenton Point State Park established.
- 1978 - Naval War College Museum in operation.
- 1980 - Newport Rugby Football Club (Rhode Island) formed.
- 1981 - Newport Jazz Festival re-established at Fort Adams.
- 1983
  - New York Yacht Club loses the America's Cup to the Royal Perth Yacht Club
  - Sail Newport established
- 1985 - Newport Folk Festival re-established at Fort Adams.
- 1993 - Yacht Restoration School founded.
- 1998
  - Newport International Film Festival begins.
  - SVF Foundation established (livestock preservation).
- 2000 - National Museum of American Illustration opens.

== 21st century ==
- 2004 - City website online (approximate date).
- 2010 - Population: 24,672.
- 2012 - October: Hurricane Sandy storm surge washes away large sections of the Cliff Walk
- 2014 - June: The Cliff Walk reopens after restoration following 2012's storm damage by Hurricane Sandy
- 2020 - March: Due to the COVID-19 pandemic, all dine-in restaurants, bars, movie theaters, and all gatherings of 25 or more are banned in Newport and across the state. This brings a halt to nearly all concerts, sports, and other events. Newport mansions are closed.
- 2022 - March: A 20-foot section of the Ciff Walk collapses near Narragansett Avenue and Webster Street and is closed

== See also ==
- Newport history
- Timeline of Providence, Rhode Island

== Bibliography ==
Published in the 18th-19th century

- Jedidiah Morse (1797), "Newport", American Gazetteer, Boston: At the presses of S. Hall, and Thomas & Andrews
- John Dix (1852), A hand-book of Newport, and Rhode Island, Newport: C. E. Hammett, Jr., OL 14010810M
- George C. Mason (1854), Newport Illustrated, New York: D. Appleton & Co., OCLC 2000062, OL 271691M
- Records of the colony of Rhode Island and Providence Plantations, in New England, A.C. Greene and Brothers, 1865, OCLC 83697440, OL 20490388M
- Frederic Denison (1879), "Newport", The past and the present: Narragansett, sea and shore, Providence: J. A. & R. A. Reid
- Joseph Sabin, ed. (1881). "Newport, R.I.". Bibliotheca Americana. Vol. 13. New York: J. Sabin. OCLC 13972268.
- Newport villa owners' summer visitors' and residents' guide to the reliable business interests of the city, Boston: W. G. Morrison & Co., 1883, OL 14030637M
- Haut ton Newport, per se: one Athens, one Rome, one London, and one Newport, Providence, R.I.: Frazier & Whiting, 1884, OL 24240041M
- "Newport (Rhode Island)" . Encyclopædia Britannica. Vol. 17 (9th ed.). 1884.
- Newport Household Directory, Providence: Sanford Publishing Co., 1887, OL 23742750M
- Richard M. Bayles, ed. (1888), History of Newport County, Rhode Island, New York: L. E. Preston & Co., OCLC 2093778, OL 6927312M
- Newport and its points of interest, New York: Mercantile Illustrating Co., 1890, OCLC 16889491, OL 13522970M
- Clarence Stanhope (1891), In and around Newport. 1891, Providence: Press of the Ryder & Dearth Co., OL 14014415M
- "City of Newport". Industries and wealth of the principal points in Rhode Island. NY: Parsons. 1892.
- Clarence Stanhope (1892), In and around Newport. 1892, Newport: Daily News job print, OL 14014416M
- Scenic views of Newport, Fall River, Mass: E.P. Charlton, 1900, OL 14041099M

Published in the 20th century

- May Van Rensselaer (1905), Newport: our social capital, Philadelphia: J.B. Lippincott, OCLC 1145979, OL 6963237M
- "Newport (Rhode Island)" . Encyclopædia Britannica (11th ed.). 1910. pp. 534–535.
- Edith May Tilley (1914), Historic Spots in Newport, Newport, R.I: Mercury Pub. Co., OCLC 14237785, OL 24181775M
- Rhode Island imprints: a list of books, pamphlets, newspapers and broadsides printed at Newport, Providence, Warren, Rhode Island, between 1727 and 1800, Providence: Rhode Island Historical Society, 1915, OL 7091649M
- A guide to Newport, Rhode Island, Newport: Gabriel Weis, 1916, OL 14010639M
- Federal Writers' Project (1937), "Newport", Rhode Island, American Guide Series, Boston: Houghton Mifflin Company, OCLC 691847 + Chronology
- William S. Godfrey, Jr. (October 1951). "The Archaeology of the Old Stone Mill in Newport, Rhode Island". American Antiquity. 17 (2): 120–129. doi:10.2307/277246. JSTOR 277246. S2CID 162235189.
- Trudy Ring and Robert M. Salkin, ed. (1995). "Newport". Americas. International Dictionary of Historic Places. Routledge. p. 471+. ISBN 978-1-134-25930-4.

== Images ==
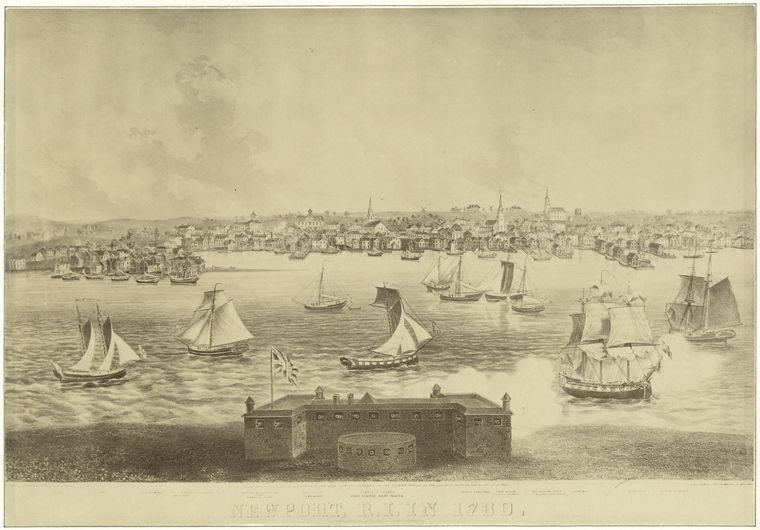
Newport, 1730

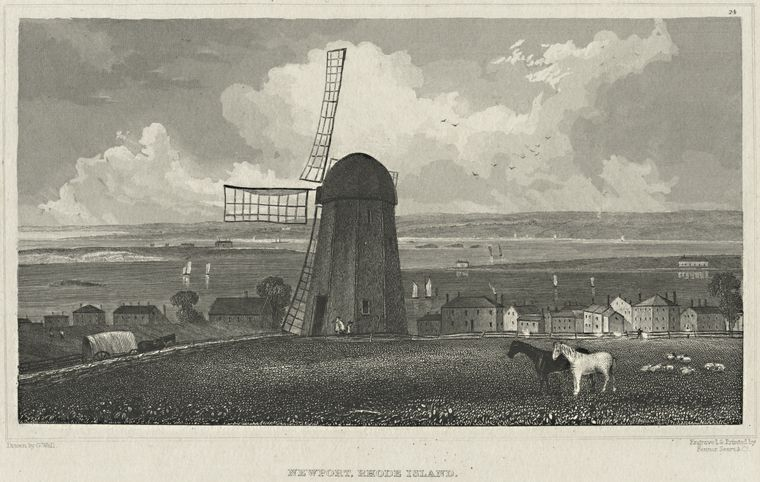
Newport, 19th century

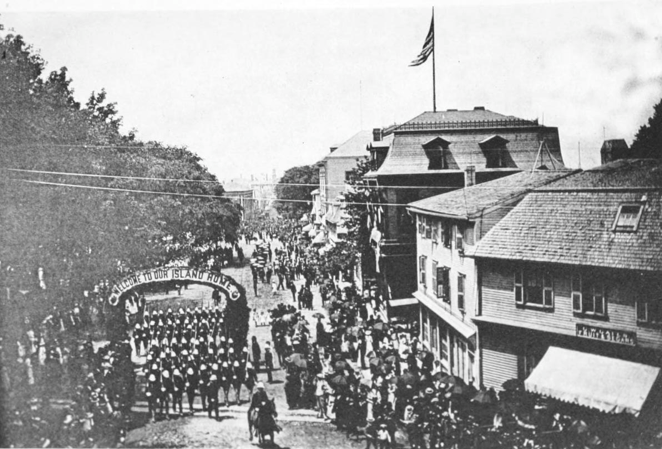
Reunion, 1884

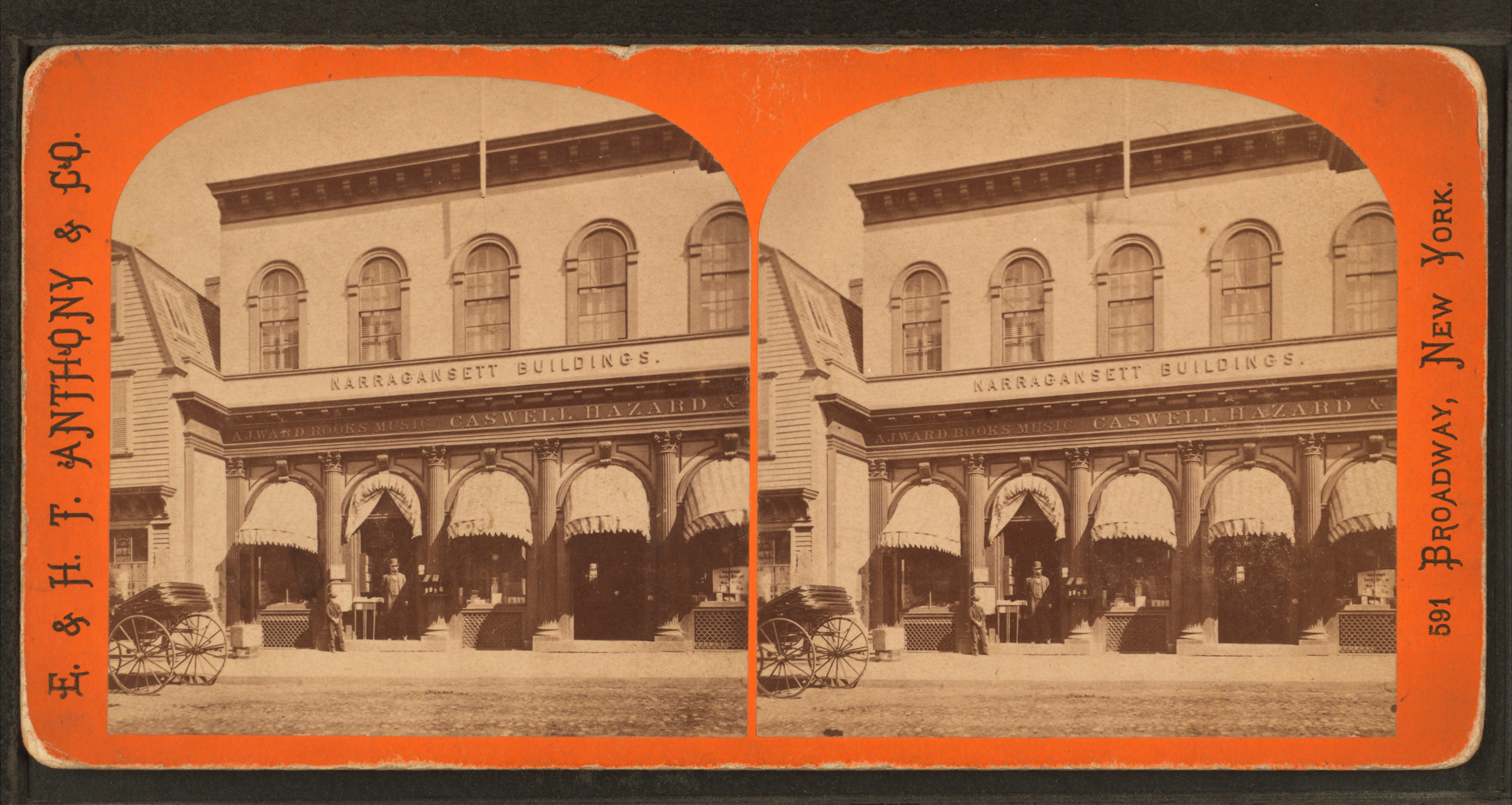
Thames Street, 19th century
