= Perry Mill =

- U.S. National Register of Historic Places
- U.S. Historic district – Contributing property
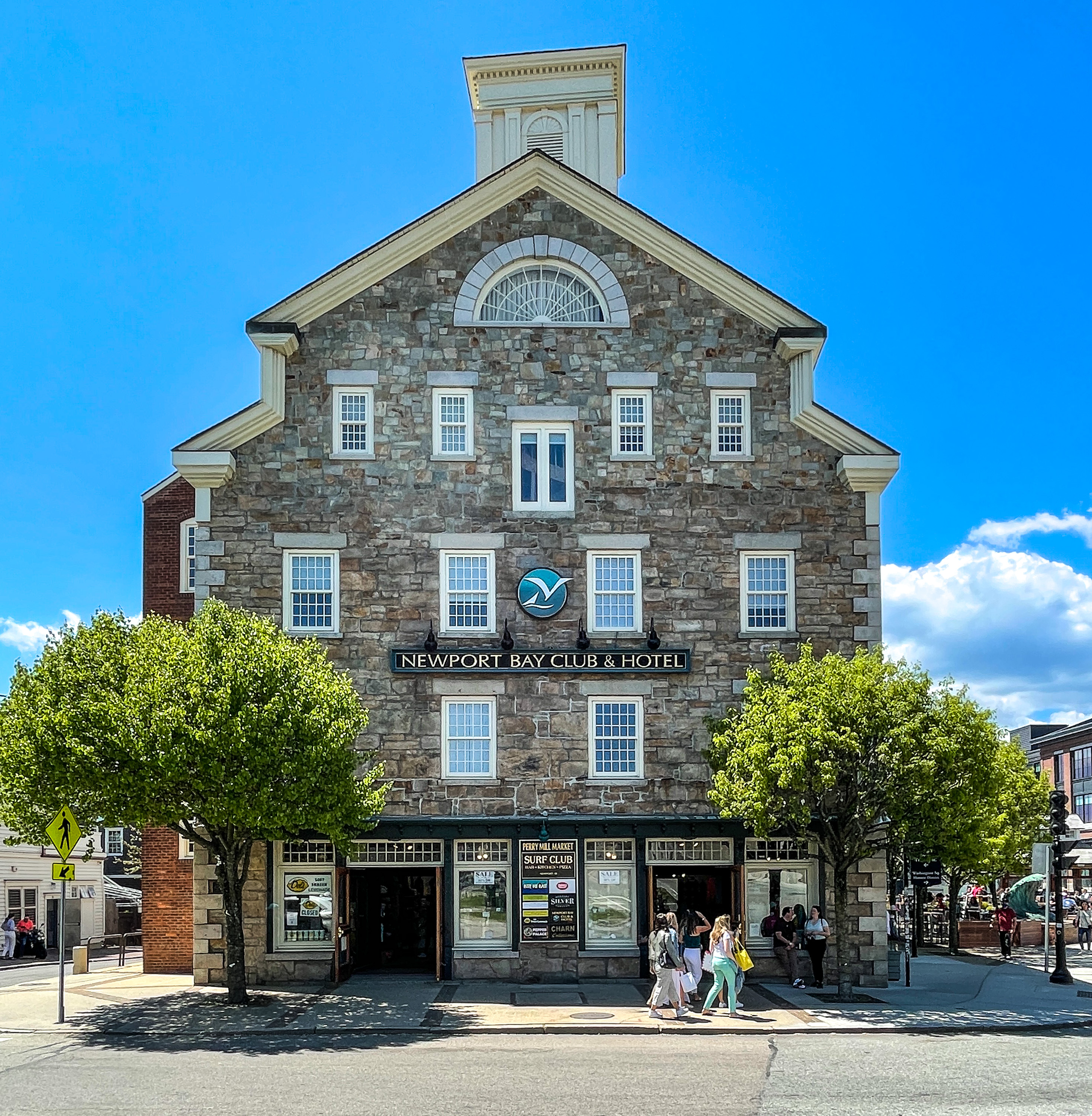

- Location within Rhode Island
- Location: 337 Thames Street; Newport, Rhode Island
- Coordinates: 41°29′2″N 71°18′55″W
- Built: 1835
- Architect: Alexander McGregor
- Part of: Southern Thames Historic District (ID08000314)
- NRHP reference No.: 72000020

Significant dates
- Added to NRHP: January 13, 1972
- Designated CP: June 26, 2008

The Perry Mill is a historic mill building at 337 Thames Street in Newport, Rhode Island. It is a large five-story stone structure on the Newport waterfront. It was built in 1835 by master stonemason Alexander MacGregor (who also oversaw the construction of Fort Adams in Newport) as part of an initiative to boost the city's flagging economy. Of the four mills built in the 1830s only this one and the Newport Steam Factory survive. This building was originally four stories when built.

It was added to the National Register of Historic Places in 1972. The building now houses a club and hotel.

== See also ==
- National Register of Historic Places listings in Newport County, Rhode Island
