= Thames Street =

Thames Street may refer to:

- Thames Street, London, England
- Thames Street, Oxford, England
- Thames Street, Rhode Island, USA
