= Newport Public Library =

Library in Newport, Rhode Island, United States

Newport Public Library (RI)
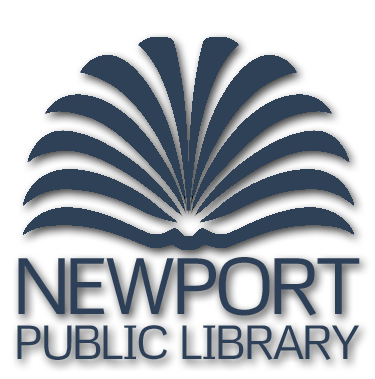
- The logo of the Newport Public Library

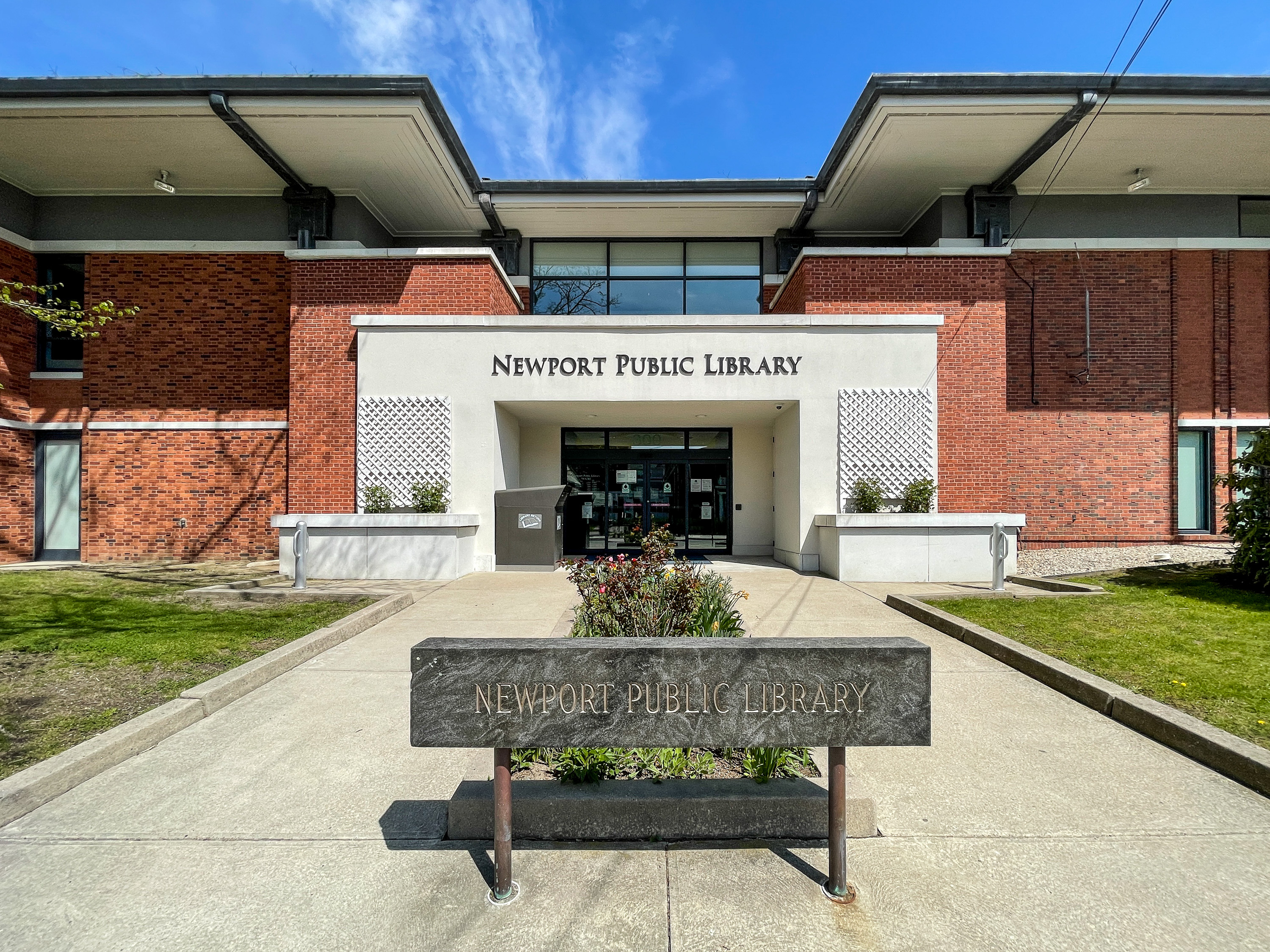
- The Newport Public Library
- 41°28′57.65″N 71°18′44.07″W
- Location: 300 Spring Street; Newport, Rhode Island, United States of America
- Type: Public Library
- Established: May 4, 1870

Collection
- Size: 145,121 (2024)

Access and use
- Circulation: 222,945 (2024)
- Population served: 24,672 (2024)

Other information
- Budget: $1,655,585
- Director: Ann Amaral
- Employees: 27
- Website: www.newportlibraryri.org

The Newport Public Library is a public library located in Newport, Rhode Island, United States. It was chartered by the State of Rhode Island in 1869 and officially opened on May 4, 1870, as the People’s Free Library. Its initial collection combined the holdings of the Newport Free Library and Townsend’s curated collection, with librarian Elma M. Dame serving in the role.

== History ==
A predecessor to the institution, the Newport Free Library and Reading Room, was established in the summer of 1865 by Sophia Louise Little and Daniel Parish Jr. They opened the library at 236 Thames Street. Their goal was to make literature and learning accessible to a wider community. Later that year, Parish returned to New York, leaving Little to manage the library on her own. Under her leadership, the library gained traction and contributed to increased literacy and public engagement in the area. The Newport Free Library and Reading Room is the first public library in Rhode Island and served as a model for others in the region.

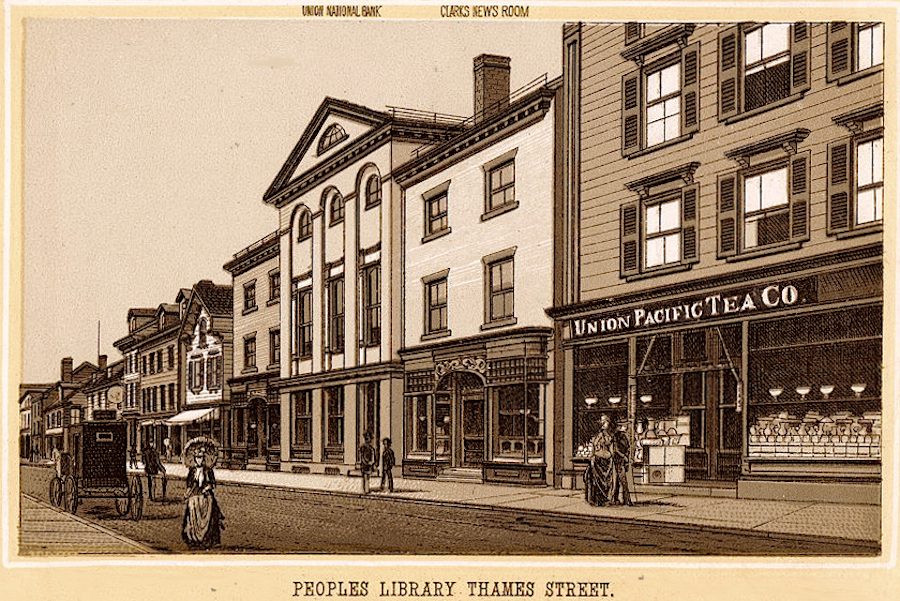
The library's first home on Thames St

The library's first location was the Rhode Island Union Bank building on Thames Street. In 1914, it moved to the Edward King House, and in October 1968, it relocated to its current building on Spring Street.

== Description ==
Located at the base of Aquidneck Park on Spring Street, just east of Newport Harbor, the library offers access to a collection of materials and resources for adults, children, and teens, including both contemporary and classic works.

=== Services ===
The Newport Public Library provides the following services:

- Lending of books, audiobooks, DVDs, CDs, magazines, and other materials.
- Access to downloadable eBooks and audiobooks.
- A "Library of Things" collection (including a telescope, sewing machine, serger, and analog converters).
- Interlibrary loan services.
- Public computers with Internet access and Wi-Fi.
- Programming for children, teenagers, and adults
- A discount bookstore offering used books, CDs, and DVDs.

== See also ==
- List of libraries in Rhode Island
