= Timeline of Providence, Rhode Island =

Coordinates: 41.824°N 71.422°W

The following is a timeline of the history of the city of Providence, Rhode Island, United States.

== Prior to 19th century ==
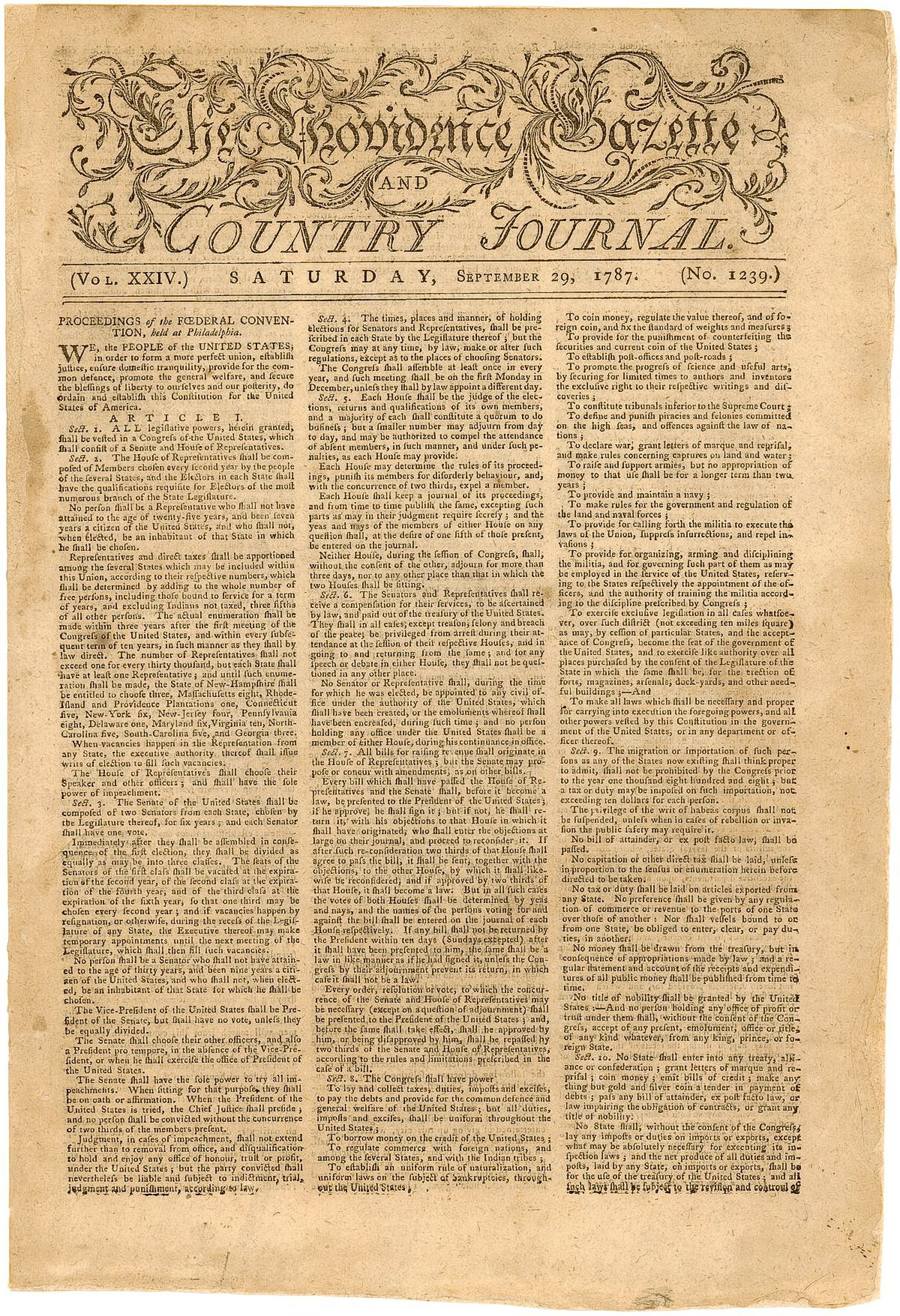
Providence Gazette, 1782

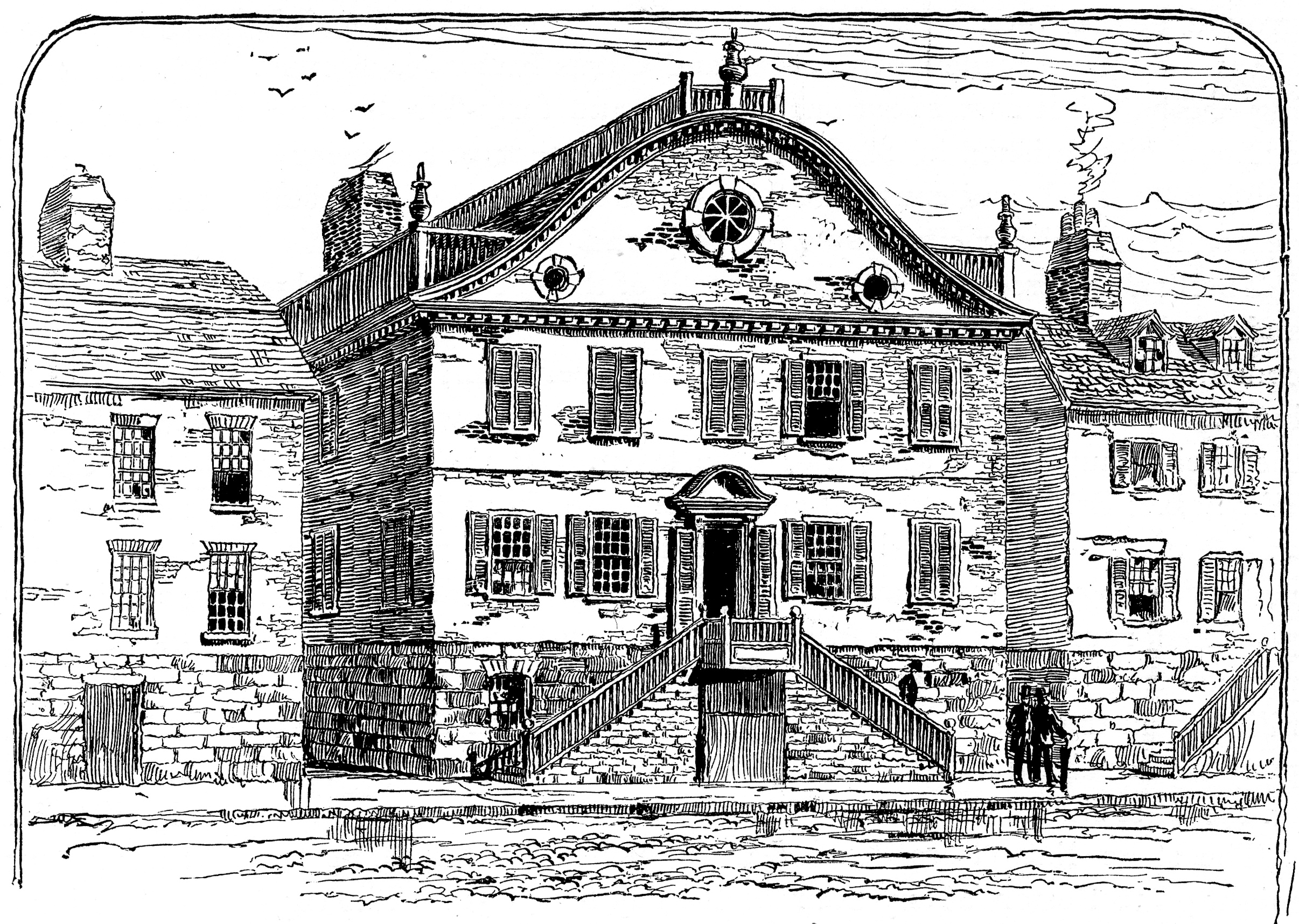
Old Providence Bank around the time of its founding, 1791

- 1635 – Great Colonial Hurricane of 1635
- 1636 – Providence founded by Roger Williams a religious reformer.
- 1638 – Baptist congregation formed.
- 1643/44 - "Received a charter from the Parliamentary Government".
- 1675 — Narragansetts and white settler-colonists battle during the King Philip's War
- 1676 — March 29: Narragansett warriors led by Canonchet burn about fifty houses, including Roger Williams' house, as part of King Philip's War
- 1683 — Roger Williams dies
- 1700 – North Burial Ground established
- 1711 – First burial at North Burial Ground
- 1743 - Beneficent Congregational Church congregation founded.
- 1753 – Providence Library Company organized.
- 1762
  - State House built.
  - William Goddard sets up printing press; Providence Gazette newspaper begins publication.
- 1764 – College in the English Colony of Rhode Island and Providence Plantations established in Warren.
- 1768 – Brick Schoolhouse built on Meeting Street.
- 1770 – College in the English Colony of Rhode Island and Providence Plantations relocated to Providence.
- 1774 - Rhode Island Supreme Court founded.
- 1775 – Market House and First Baptist Meetinghouse built.
- 1776 – 1777: Colonial and French troops use University Hall as a barracks and hospital during the American Revolutionary War
- 1784 — January: Flooding on the Moshassuck River caused the greatest damage seen since the burning of the town during King Philip's War
- 1785 – Beneficent Congregational Society established.
- 1788
  - John Brown House built.
  - de Warville describes the town as "decayed".
- 1789
  - Providence Association of Mechanics and Manufacturers
  - Providence Society for Abolishing the Slave-Trade established.
- 1790
  - U.S. Custom House established.
  - Population: 6,380.
- 1791 - October: Providence Bank on South Main Street incorporated; later known as Providence National Bank, Providence Union Bank and Trust Company, Industrial National Bank, and FleetBoston Financial.
- 1793 - The first covered drawbridge is built over the Seekonk River where the Washington Bridge currently stands, followed the same year by the Central Bridge farther north.
- 1794 – Serril Dodge opens his first jewelry store on North Main Street, thus beginning Providence's jewelry industry
- 1795 – Theatre opens.
- 1798 – Providence Marine Society established.

== 19th century ==
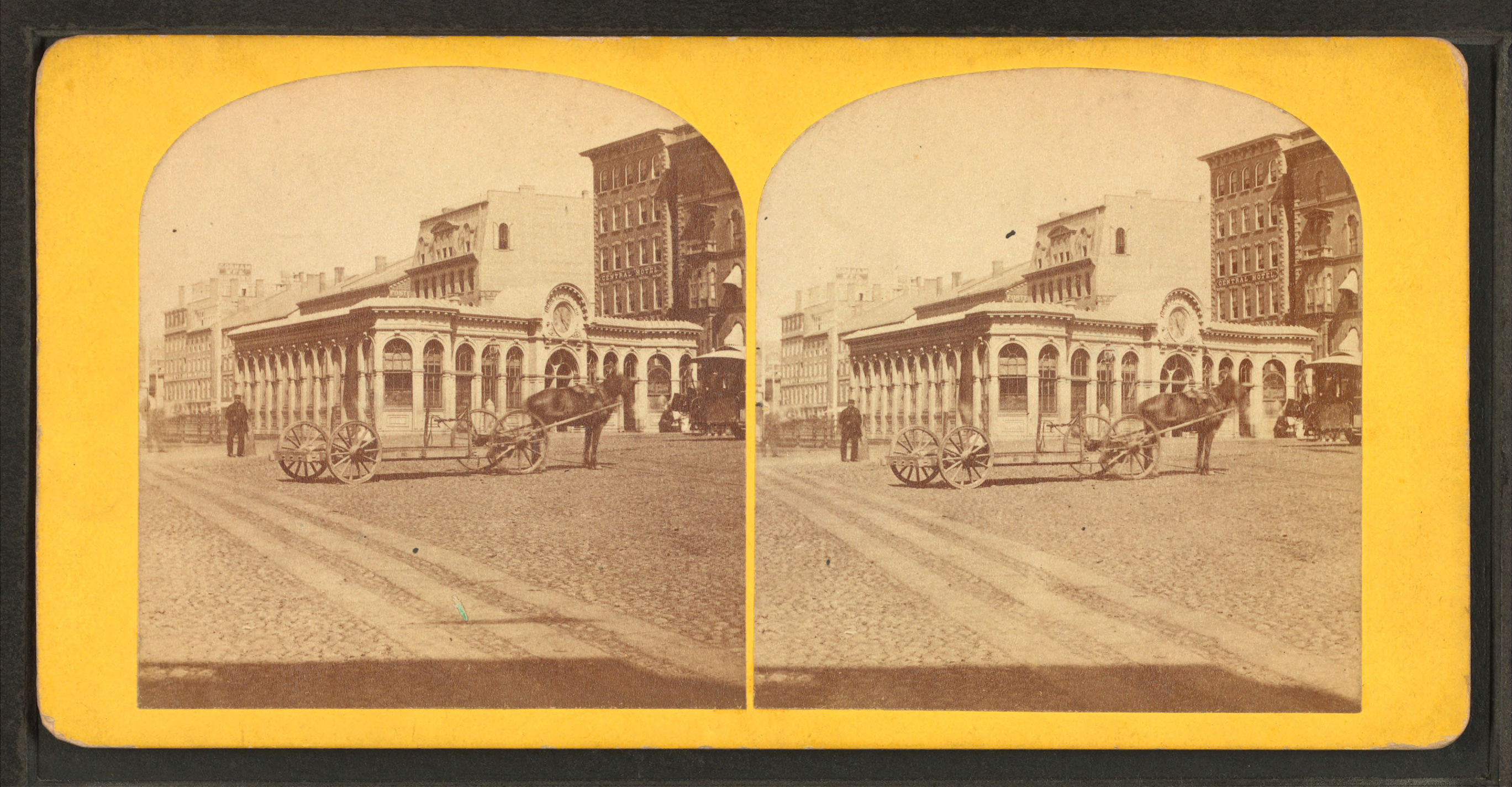
Union Railroad depot, Providence, 19th century

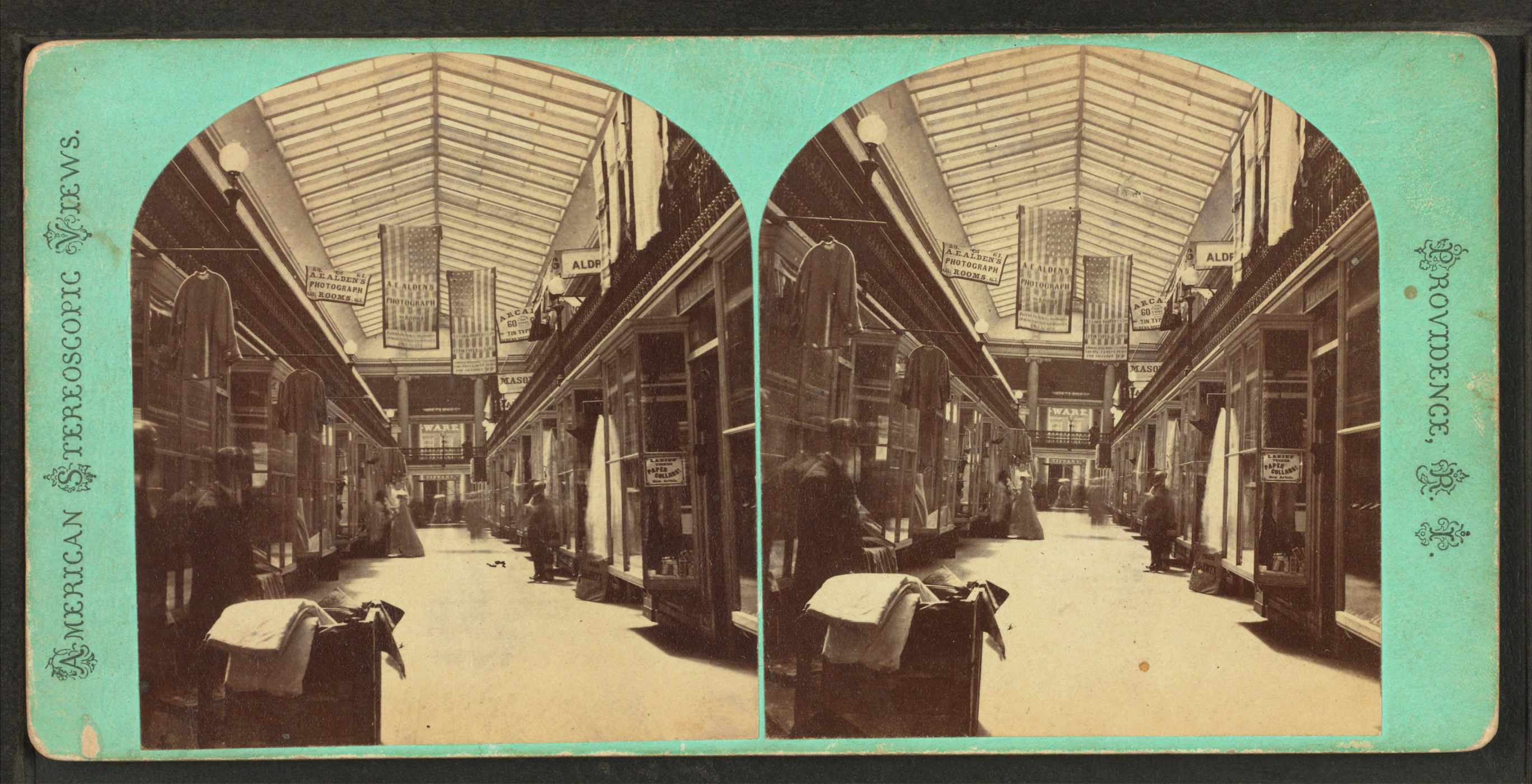
Arcade, Providence, 19th century

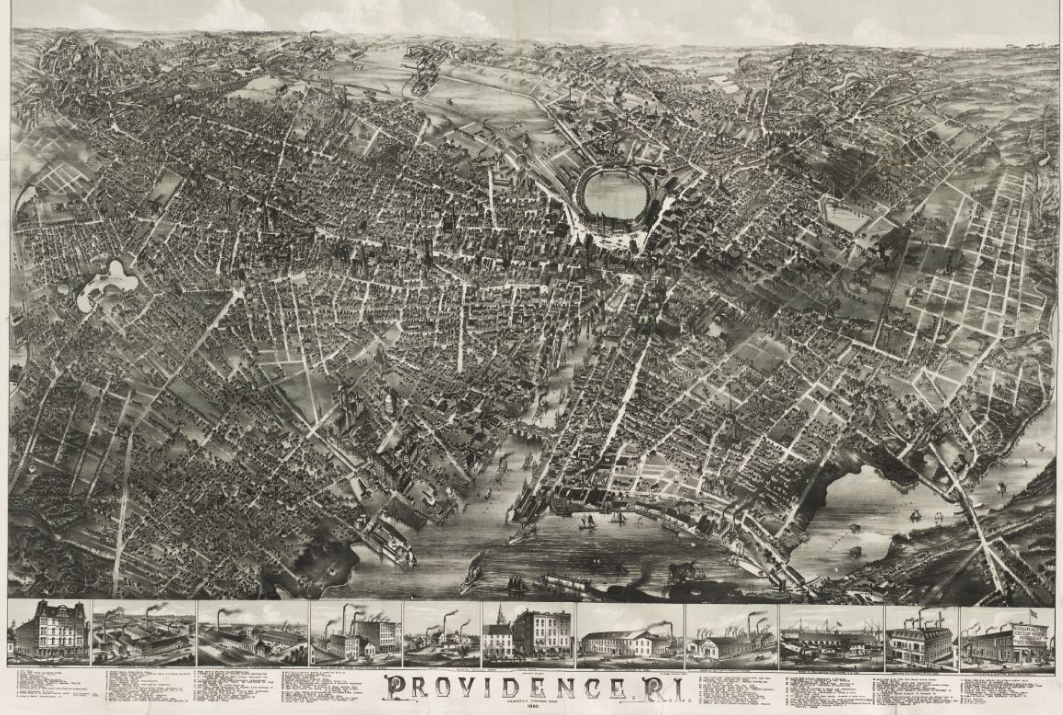
Map of Providence, 1882

- 1800 — Population: 7,614.
- 1801
  - January 21 — The first "Great Fire" destroys 37 buildings and leaves many families homeless
  - Providence Marine Corps of Artillery founded.
- 1802 – Providence Phoenix newspaper begins publication.
- 1805 — Providence streets receive official names for the first time
- 1810
  - Cathedral of St. John built.
  - Population: 10,071.
- 1814 - Union Bank of Providence founded.
- 1815 - September 23: The Great Gale of 1815 causes extensive damage and flooding.
- 1816 - October 13: The First Congregational Church (Unitarian) dedicated, now known as First Unitarian Church.
- 1818 – Rhode Island Peace Society and Merchants Bank established.
- 1819
  - New England Yearly Meeting Boarding School opens.
  - The Congdon Street Baptist Church is founded as the first independent Black church in the stat
- 1820 - January 3: The Manufacturers' & Farmers' Journal, Providence & Pawtucket Advertiser begins publication, precursor to The Providence Journal.
- 1822 - Rhode Island Historical Society founded.
- 1823
  - April — The first ordinance passed requiring snow removal from sidewalks within 24 hours after falling
  - Providence Franklin Society incorporated.
- 1824
  - The first city directory issued
  - Race riot in Hard Scrabble
  - August 23 — Lafayette visited Providence for the first time since the Revolutionary War to great acclaim
  - The Franklin Society a secret society based at Brown University founded.
- 1825 - May — the second "Great Fire" began at the corner of Union and Westminster Streets
- 1828
  - Dexter Asylum built.
  - Westminster Arcade built.
  - High Street Bank established.
  - Herald newspaper begins publication.
- 1829 - The Providence Journal newspaper begins publishing daily.
- 1830 - "Providence had ceased to be a great port and had begun to be a textile manufacturing place".
- 1831
  - Boston and Providence Railroad begins operating.
  - Race riot in Snow Town.
  - Gorham Silver and Franklin Lyceum established.
- 1832
  - City incorporated. City government meets at Market House
  - Samuel W. Bridgham elected first mayor.
- 1833
  - David Brown opens a shop on South Main Street that later becomes Brown & Sharpe
  - Sylvester Graham Riot.
- 1835 – Train station and first India Point Railroad Bridge built.
- 1836
  - Providence Athenaeum formed.
  - City hosts Rhode Island Anti-Slavery convention.
- 1838
  - Providence Association for the Benefit of Colored Children organized.
  - Narragansett Boat Club organized.
  - Solomon Pareira, first known Jewish resident of Providence, moves to the city from Holland
- 1839 – Providence Marine Corps of Artillery armory built.
- 1841/42 - Dorr Rebellion

- 1843 – Classical High School established.
- 1844
  - Butler Hospital for the Insane founded.
  - Corliss, Nightingale & Co. in business.
- 1845
  - The City Council votes to prepare plans for a new City Hall
  - Grace Church built.
  - Laureldale Chemical Works established.
- 1846
  - Swan Point Cemetery established.
  - Scholfield's Commercial College, a business college located downtown, established.
  - A. T. Cross Company established.
  - John Carter Brown Library established.
- 1847
  - Providence and Worcester Railroad begins operating
  - Union Railroad Depot built
  - Providence Tool Company established.
- 1848
  - Providence Medical Association instituted.
  - B.B. and R. Knight, which later becomes Fruit of the Loom, established
- 1850 – Providence Reform School opens.
- 1852
  - Central Congregational Church established.
  - Locust Grove Cemetery incorporated.
- 1853
  - Providence Young Men's Christian Union established
  - Joseph Brown teams with Lucian Sharpe to form Brown & Sharpe
- 1854
  - A cholera pandemic sweeps the city, especially among crowded immigrants and workers. Local cemeteries see record numbers of burials. For the next 30 years, 1854 is remembered as "The Year of Cholera."
  - Hartford, Providence and Fishkill Railroad begins operating.
  - Sons of Israel, city's first Jewish congregation established
- 1855
  - James Y. Smith becomes mayor.
  - Providence Aid Society organized.
  - U.S. Customshouse built.
- 1856 – Thomas Howland elected Warden of The Third Ward making him the first person of African heritage to hold office in the city
- 1860 - Population: 50,666.
- 1863
  - Bryant and Stratton National Business College (now Bryant University) opens a campus in Providence
  - Rhode Island Hospital founded.
- 1865
  - Rhode Island Locomotive Works produced 3,400 steam locomotives until closed in 1899.
  - Population: 54,595.
- 1866 - Providence receives state approval to tap the Pawtuxet River as a source of drinking water
- 1867
  - Young Women's Christian Association organized.
  - Babcock & Wilcox founded.
- 1868
  - Rhode Island Hospital dedicated.
  - Women's City Missionary Society organized.
- 1869
  - Morning Star newspaper begins publication.
  - November: Prospect Terrace Park created.
- "1870s" – A sewer system is constructed which discharges city waste into the harbor.
- 1871
  - Roger Williams Park donated to the people of Providence by Betsy Williams
  - Thanksgiving Day: Providence municipal water service begins, pumping water from the Pawtuxet River
  - Soldiers' and Sailors' Monument dedicated.
- 1872
  - Roger Williams Park & Roger Williams Park Zoo founded.
  - First Universalist Church built.
  - First Point Street Bridge built.
  - Construction begins on the Brown and Sharpe Manufacturing Company Complex along the Woonasquatucket River
  - Butler Exchange Building founded.
- 1874 - Cornerstone of City Hall was laid on June 24.
- 1876 – Rhode Island Women's Club established.
- 1877
  - Rhode Island School of Design and museum established.
  - Providence County Court House dedicated.
  - Grammar school built on Candace Street.
- 1878
  - Providence Grays baseball team formed; Messer Street Grounds baseball stadium built
  - Cathedral of Saints Peter and Paul completed.
  - Providence City Hall opens on November 14.
  - Providence Public Library opens.
  - Homeopathic Hospital founded.
- 1880 – Providence Art Club incorporated.
- 1881 - Sayles Memorial Hall built.
- 1883
  - Providence Press Club formed.
  - Providence Literary Association organized.
- 1884
  - Providence Lying-In Hospital founded.
  - Providence Camera Club organized.
  - October: The Providence Grays win baseball's 1884 World Series championship game
- 1885
  - Fleur-de-lys Studios built
  - Providence Grays baseball team disbanded
  - The Providence Journal begins publishing seven days per week.
- 1886
  - June 9: Thomas A. Doyle dies in office, Providence's longest-serving mayor (18 years).
  - June 14: Providence businesses shut down as Mayor Doyle's funeral procession marches through the city.
- 1888 - City Hall was powered by electric lighting for the first time
- 1890
  - Providence's jewelry industry includes more than 200 firms with almost 7,000 workers
  - Population: 132,146.
- 1891
  - Providence Athletic Association incorporated.
  - The Outlet Company established.
  - Providence News begins publication.
- 1892
  - Rhode Island College of Agriculture and the Mechanic Arts founded.
  - First electric streetcar begins operation on January 20.
- 1893 – New edifice for Central Congregational Church completed.
- 1894 – Providence Engineering Society founded.
- 1896 – Providence Water Color Club organized.
- 1897 – Emma Goldman arrested for "open-air speaking" at Market Square.
- 1898 – Union Station rebuilt.
- 1900
  - Becomes the sole capital of Rhode Island.
  - Population: 175,597.

== 20th century ==
- 1901
  - Providence's first sewage treatment plant begins "chemical precipitation" treatment of city waste, one of the first such plants in the US.
  - Rhode Island State House built.
- 1903 — Manchester Street Power Station constructed.
- 1905
  - Handicraft Club organized.
  - Population: 198,635.
- 1906 – Evening Tribune newspaper begins publication.
- 1907 – Annmary Brown Memorial museum dedicated.
- 1908 – Federal Building constructed.
- 1909 - Lincoln Woods State Park founded.
- 1910 – Population: 224,326.
- 1913 - Turk's Head Building constructed
- 1914
  - August – September: A series of civil disturbances known as the Macaroni Riots occur in Federal Hill, leading to 50 arrests and thousands of dollars in damages.
  - September: Johnson & Wales School of Business was formed, later becomes known as Johnson & Wales University
- 1915 — Population of "city proper:" 247,660 (census of 1915)
- 1916 - June 3: 54,000 people march through downtown in a six and one-half hour parade in a show of support for Woodrow Wilson's war preparedness efforts.
- 1917 - October 14: A Silent Parade is held by 1,800 African-Americans in Providence as part of a national protest against racial violence. The New York Age, a black newspaper, reported that "the marchers were accorded every courtesy by the large throngs of white people."
- 1918
  - September: the first cases of Spanish flu are reported early this month; by the end of the month, over 2,500 influenza cases filled city hospitals.
  - October 6: The Board of Health issues a general closure order to combat the influenza outbreak.
  - October 3–9: The influenza epidemic reaches its peak, with over 6,700 cases reported.
  - October 25: The closure order is rescinded.
  - December: A second influenza wave hits the city, though smaller than in October. No general closure is ordered.
- 1919
  - January: The second influenza wave sweeps through the city's school system.
  - February 5: No new cases of influenza are reported, and the pandemic is declared over.
- 1925 – Cycledrome opens, reportedly "the largest and fastest bicycle track in the United States."
- 1926 - Miriam Hospital opens.
- 1928
  - Construction finishes on the Industrial Trust Building (a.k.a. "Superman Building").
  - February: Providence author H. P. Lovecraft publishes his most famous story The Call of Cthulhu in Weird Tales magazine
  - Vedanta Society of Providence founded.
  - The Providence Steam Rollers are named NFL champions, after finishing the season with the best record.
- 1930 - 25 September: Current Washington Bridge south span opens
- 1932 - Rhode Island Public Expenditure Council headquartered in city.
- 1935 - Bryant College of Business Administration, now known as Bryant University, moves from downtown to the East Side
- 1937 - March 15: Author H.P. Lovecraft dies, aged 46
- 1938 – September: Hurricane.
- 1945 – The Providence Journal wins its first Pulitzer Prize
- 1949 – WJAR-TV begins broadcasting.
- 1950 – Veterans Memorial Auditorium opens.
- 1953 – The Providence Journal wins its second Pulitzer Prize
- 1954 – Hurricane Carol strikes the area.
- 1955 – WPRO-TV begins broadcasting.
- 1956
  - Raymond L. S. Patriarca moves the New England organized crime family to Providence, setting up shop at a vending machine and pinball business on Federal Hill.
  - Providence Preservation Society organized.
- 1957 – Dexter Asylum demolished.
- 1958
  - A one-mile section of Interstate 195 is completed in the Jewelry District; the highway is completed to the state line in 1960.
  - Construction of Interstate 95 begins in Providence. Over the next few years, Interstates 95 and 195 will demolish large parts of several established neighborhoods, displace hundreds of homes and businesses, and leave the city split into several disconnected segments.
- 1961
  - A District Master Plan known as "Downtown 1970" is issued by the city. Between 1965 and 1975, several city neighborhoods are razed by the Providence Redevelopment Authority.
  - July: Construction on Fox Point Hurricane Barrier begun
- 1962 – Brown Broadcasting Service established.
- 1964
  - Westminster Street is converted to a pedestrianized mall, intended to compete with suburban indoor shopping malls.
  - Once-grand Brown & Sharpe Manufacturing Company abandons its sprawling location along the Woonasquatucket River for a modern plant in North Kingstown.
- 1966 – January: Fox Point Hurricane Barrier completed
- 1968 – Rhode Island League of Cities and Towns headquartered in Providence.
- 1969 – Current Henderson Bridge opens
- 1971
  - Bryant College vacates Providence for Smithfield
  - Desegregation of the Providence Public Schools
- 1972 – Providence Zen Center founded.
- 1974 — 'Interface: Providence' is released by a Rhode Island School of Design architecture class. This "visionary" and "radical" master plan departs from previous plans and focuses "not how to best to keep the Downtown alive, but rather how to repurpose its ruins" and influences future advocates for Downtown.
- 1975
  - Buddy Cianci becomes mayor.
  - Eight thieves carry out the Bonded Vault heist, the largest heist and, subsequently, the longest and costliest trial in state history.
- 1976 - November: Masjid Al-Karim, Islamic Center of Rhode Island, established.
- 1978
  - February: The Great Blizzard paralyzes Providence with nearly 28 inches of snow. Governor J. Joseph Garrahy comforts the city and state by wearing a flannel shirt.
  - City Archives established.
  - The city's jewelry industry peaks, with 32,500 workers, then begins a decline.
- 1980
  - Voters approve an $87 million bond issue to improve municipal sewage treatment plant
  - The Narragansett Bay Commission was formed
  - The Guinness Book of World Records names the Crawford Street Bridge the "widest in the world" at 1,147 feet.
- 1984
  - First Night Providence begins
  - Mayor Buddy Cianci forced to resign after pleading "no contest" to an assault charge
- 1986
  - Providence Business News begins publication.
  - Providence Station opens.
- 1989 — The pedestrianized Westminster Mall is torn up and Westminster Street is re-opened to vehicular traffic.
- 1990 – Governor Henry Lippitt House museum opens (approximate date).
- 1991
  - Buddy Cianci returns to the mayor's office
  - Embezzlement at the Heritage Loan & Investment bank triggers the Rhode Island banking crisis.
- 1994
  - Waterplace Park constructed.
  - WaterFire begins.
  - Gun court established in the Providence Superior Court.
- 1996 - The Providence Journal goes public and subsequently was purchased by the Dallas-based A.H. Belo Company
- 1997
  - City website online (approximate date).
  - Providence Children's Museum opens.
- 1999
  - Providence Place Mall opens.

== 21st century ==
- 2001 - April: Sitting mayor Buddy Cianci is indicted on federal criminal charges of racketeering, conspiracy, extortion, witness tampering, and mail fraud
- 2002
  - Soviet submarine K-77 museum opens
  - September: Mayor Buddy Cianci is sentenced to serve five years in federal prison
- 2003 – David Cicilline becomes mayor, the first openly gay mayor of a U.S. state capital.
- 2005 – January: The North American blizzard of 2005 drops 17 inches of snow on downtown Providence
- 2006 – Haffenreffer Museum of Anthropology opens at Brown University.
- 2007
  - April 18: Soviet submarine K-77 sinks after a storm.
  - May: Former mayor Cianci released from prison
  - November: New Iway bridge opens for eastbound traffic
- 2008 - Historic Westminster Arcade closes for renovations
- 2009 - October: Final section of Iway bridge opens for westbound traffic.
- 2010
  - Population: 178,042.
  - March: A series of rainstorms causes severe flood damage. President Obama declares a state of emergency for the region.
- 2011
  - January: Angel Taveras becomes mayor.
  - August 28: Hurricane Irene downs 300-400 trees and leaves 12,700 without power.
  - October: Occupy protest begins.
  - November: Open Providence Commission for Transparency and Accountability established.
- 2012 - October 29: Hurricane Sandy hits Providence. The Fox Point Hurricane Barrier is credited with saving the city from major damage.
- 2013
  - February: Winter Storm Nemo drops 27 inches of snow; Hurricane-force winds topple trees, and many people lose power
  - Historic Westminster Arcade re-opens after renovation
  - Historic Mayoral portraits in City Hall cleaned and restored
  - April: The landmark Industrial Trust Building, a.k.a. "Superman Building," loses its sole tenant, and goes dark.
- 2014 - October 17: The Phoenix publishes its last print issue
- 2015
  - January 5: Jorge Elorza sworn in as mayor
  - January: Kennedy Plaza re-opens after major renovation
  - September 20: George Redman Linear Park, a bicycle and pedestrian path on the Washington Bridge, was dedicated.
- 2016
  - January 28: Former mayor Buddy Cianci dies
  - February 6–7: Former mayor Cianci lies in state at City Hall
  - February 8: Cianci's funeral procession marches through the city, stopping for a funeral mass at the Cathedral of Saints Peter and Paul and ending at St. Ann's Cemetery in Cranston for burial.
  - September 11: Mayor Elorza and the president of the firefighter's union come to an agreement after a 13-month contract dispute.
- 2017 - November: Thousands lose power after Tropical Storm Philippe
- 2018
  - May: The Cable Car Cinema, an independent art cinema on South Main Street, closes its doors. The cinema had been in operation since the 1970s.
  - September: Providence's first bicycle sharing program begins.
- 2019
  - July 17: The Wexford Innovation Center opens. It is one of the first projects in the I-195 Redevelopment District.
  - August: Providence's bicycle sharing program is suspended after widespread vandalism and criminal activity.
  - August 9: The $21.9-million Providence River Pedestrian and Bicycle Bridge, built on footings which once carried I-195 across the Providence River, opens.
- 2020
  - January: Mayor Elorza introduces a Great Streets Initiative and Urban Trail Network Master Plan, a framework of public space improvements to encourage walking, riding bicycles, and public transit.
  - March: Due to the COVID-19 pandemic, all dine-in restaurants, bars, movie theaters, and all gatherings of 25 or more are banned in Providence and across the state by order of Governor Raimondo. This brings a halt to nearly all concerts, sports, and other events in the city. Providence public schools and the Providence Place Mall are closed. Providence College, Rhode Island College, Brown University, RISD, and Johnson and Wales suspend in-person classes and move to online instruction.
  - May 30: Over a week of demonstrations begin as part of a nationwide series of Civil Rights protests. The marches, attracting as many as 10,000, were called the "largest protest(s) in recent history," and were mostly peaceful, despite violence in other cities.
  - June 2–6: A weeklong curfew is introduced by mayor Jorge Elorza in response to unrest after some early protests, then is rescinded early.
  - July: Protesters calling to defund the police hold a series of protests and marches at the State House and Public Safety Complex. A civilian police oversight board is established to review police tactics.
- 2021 – May 14: Eight people are shot and wounded (ninth victim wounded from glass shards) in Washington Park. The shooting was believed by authorities to have stemmed from conflict between two rival groups. Dozens of shots were fired in the gang shootout. In 2022, three adult males were sentenced to 10–12 years in prison each, plus 20 years of parole each.
- 2023
  - January 2: Brett Smiley sworn in as 39th mayor of Providence.
  - December 11: A structural engineer discovers a "critical structural failure" in the Washington Bridge, causing the DOT to close all Interstate 195 westbound lanes, causing "catastrophic traffic" throughout Providence and neighboring East Providence.
  - December 15: An emergency bypass is opened on the Washington Bridge, which allows two lanes of westbound traffic to use two lanes of the eastbound span.
- 2024 – The Independent Man, a 14-foot gilded statue atop the State House, is restored.
- 2025 – December 13: A gunman killed at least two students and injured nine others in a shooting at Brown University.

== See also ==
- History of Providence, Rhode Island
- List of mayors of Providence, Rhode Island
- National Register of Historic Places listings in Providence, Rhode Island
- Timeline of Newport, Rhode Island

== Bibliography ==
Published in the 19th century

- David Brewster, ed. (1830). "Rhode Island". Edinburgh Encyclopaedia. Edinburgh: William Blackwood.
- "Providence, R.I.", American Advertising Directory, for Manufacturers and Dealers in American Goods, New York: Jocelyn, Darling & Co., 1831, OCLC 1018684
- Charter and Ordinances of the City of Providence, Knowles and Vose, printers, 1845, OL 7095737M
- "Providence", Appleton's Illustrated Hand-book of American Cities, New York: D. Appleton and Company, 1876
- Foster, William Eaton (1879). "Providence" . Encyclopædia Britannica. Vol. 10 (9th ed.).
- Joseph Sabin, ed. (1885). "Providence, R.I.". Bibliotheca Americana. Vol. 15–16. New York: Joseph Sabin. OCLC 13972268. part 2
- Greene, Welcome Arnold (1886). The Providence Plantations for Two Hundred and Fifty Years: The People and their Neighbors, their Pursuits and Progress 1636-1886: An Historical Review of the Foundation, Rise and Progress of the City of Providence. J. A. & R. A. Reid.
- Providence Directory. Providence, Rhode Island: Sampson, Murdock & Co. 1889.
- George Owen Willard (1891), History of the Providence stage, 1762-1891, Providence: Rhode Island News Co., OL 7237402M
- Mariana M. Tallman (1893), "In and about Providence", Pleasant places in Rhode Island, and how to reach them, Providence: The Providence Journal Company
- Providence House Directory and Family Address Book. Sampson, Murdock & Co. 1899.

Published in the 20th century

- William Kirk (1909), A Modern City: Providence, Rhode Island and Its Activities, University of Chicago Press, OCLC 1431257, OL 23539337M
- "Providence" . Encyclopædia Britannica. Vol. 22 (11th ed.). 1911. pp. 511–512.
- Old Providence: a collection of facts and traditions relating to various buildings and sites of historic interest in Providence, Providence, R.I: Printed for the Merchants National Bank of Providence, 1918, OCLC 9992847, OL 6608582M
- Providence Directory. Providence, Rhode Island: Sampson & Murdock. 1919.
- Federal Writers' Project (1937), "Providence", Rhode Island: a Guide to the Smallest State, American Guide Series, Boston: Houghton Mifflin, hdl:2027/mdp.39015046809193
- "Rhode Island, Modern City-State", National Geographic Magazine, vol. 94, Washington DC: National Geographic Partners, 1948 (describes Providence)
- Conforti, Joseph (1976). Our Heritage: a History of East Providence. White Plains, New York: Monarch Publishing, Inc.
- Ory Mazar Nergal, ed. (1980), "Providence, Rhode Island", Encyclopedia of American Cities, New York: E.P. Dutton, OL 4120668M
- Trudy Ring and Robert M. Salkin, ed. (1995). "Providence". Americas. International Dictionary of Historic Places. Routledge. p. 524+. ISBN 978-1-134-25930-4.

Published in the 21st century

- "Rhode Island: Providence", New England (3rd ed.), Lonely Planet, 2002, OL 24765202M
- Li, Sophia (February 27, 2009), "The East Side's Untold Story", Brown Daily Herald
