= Charles Tillinghast House =

Historic house in Rhode Island

- U.S. National Register of Historic Places
- U.S. National Historic Landmark District – Contributing property
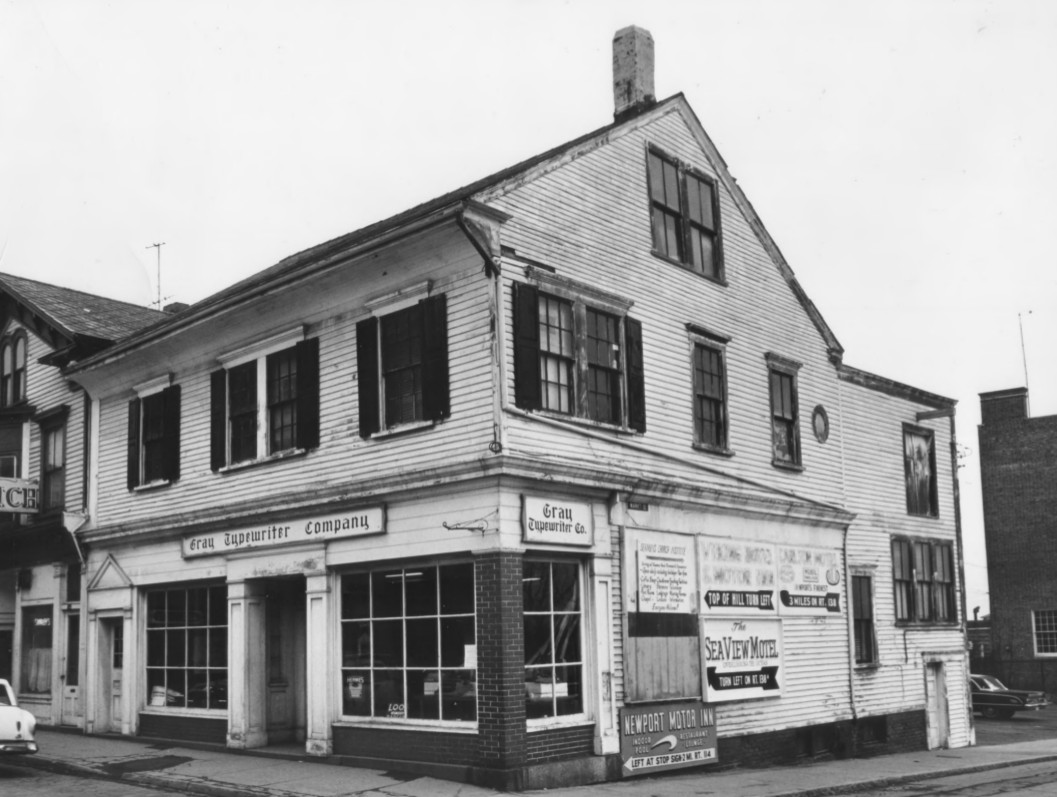

- Location within Rhode Island Location within the United States
- Location: 243-245 Thame St., Newport, Rhode Island
- Coordinates: 41°29′19″N 71°18′54″W
- Built: 1715
- Demolished: c. 1973
- Part of: Newport Historic District (ID68000001)
- NRHP reference No.: 72001576

Significant dates
- Added to NRHP: January 20, 1972
- Designated NHLDCP: November 24, 1968

The Charles Tillinghast House was a historic house at 243–245 Thames Street in downtown Newport, Rhode Island. It was a 2 1/2-story timber-frame structure, with a side-gable roof, built around 1710–20. It was one of the oldest buildings in the city. It was probably built by Charles Tillinghast, whose family was among the founders of Rhode Island. The house had a distinctive cove-shaped plaster cornice, typically found on houses of this period. It was one of the first houses to be built on Thames Street.

The house was listed on the National Register of Historic Places in 1972. It was demolished shortly after to make way for an extension of America's Cup Highway to Memorial Boulevard.

== See also ==
- National Register of Historic Places listings in Newport County, Rhode Island
