= Whitehorne House Museum =

Historic house in Rhode Island, United States

- U.S. National Register of Historic Places
- U.S. Historic district – Contributing property
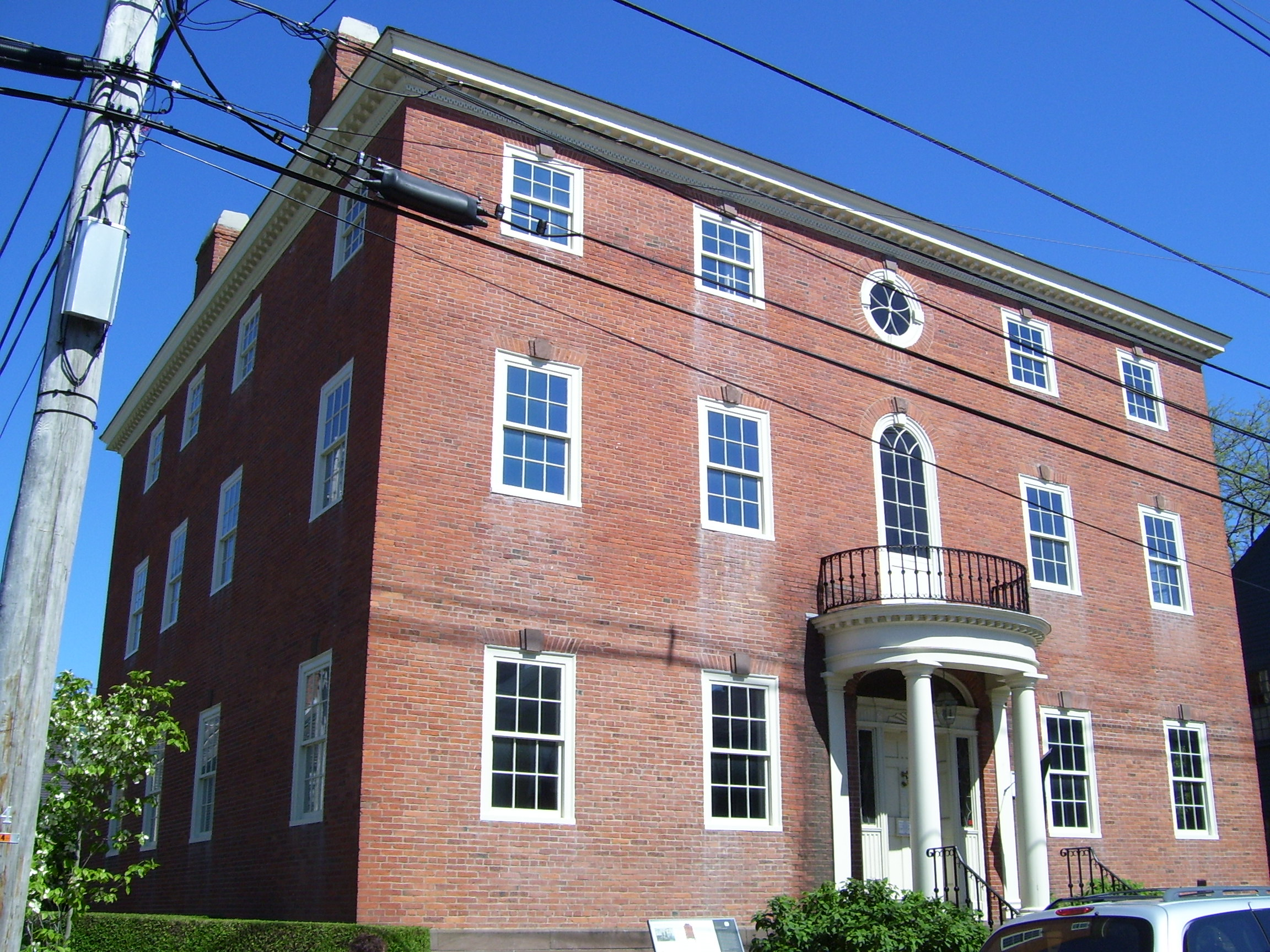

- Location within Rhode Island Location within the United States
- Location: Newport, Rhode Island, United States of America
- Coordinates: 41°28′55″N 71°18′53″W
- Built: 1810
- Architectural style: Federal Style
- Part of: Southern Thames Historic District (ID08000314)
- NRHP reference No.: 71000028

Significant dates
- Added to NRHP: May 6, 1971
- Designated CP: June 26, 2008

The Whitehorne House is an example of a United States Federal style mansions at 416 Thames Street in Newport, Rhode Island and is open to the public as a historic house museum.

== History ==
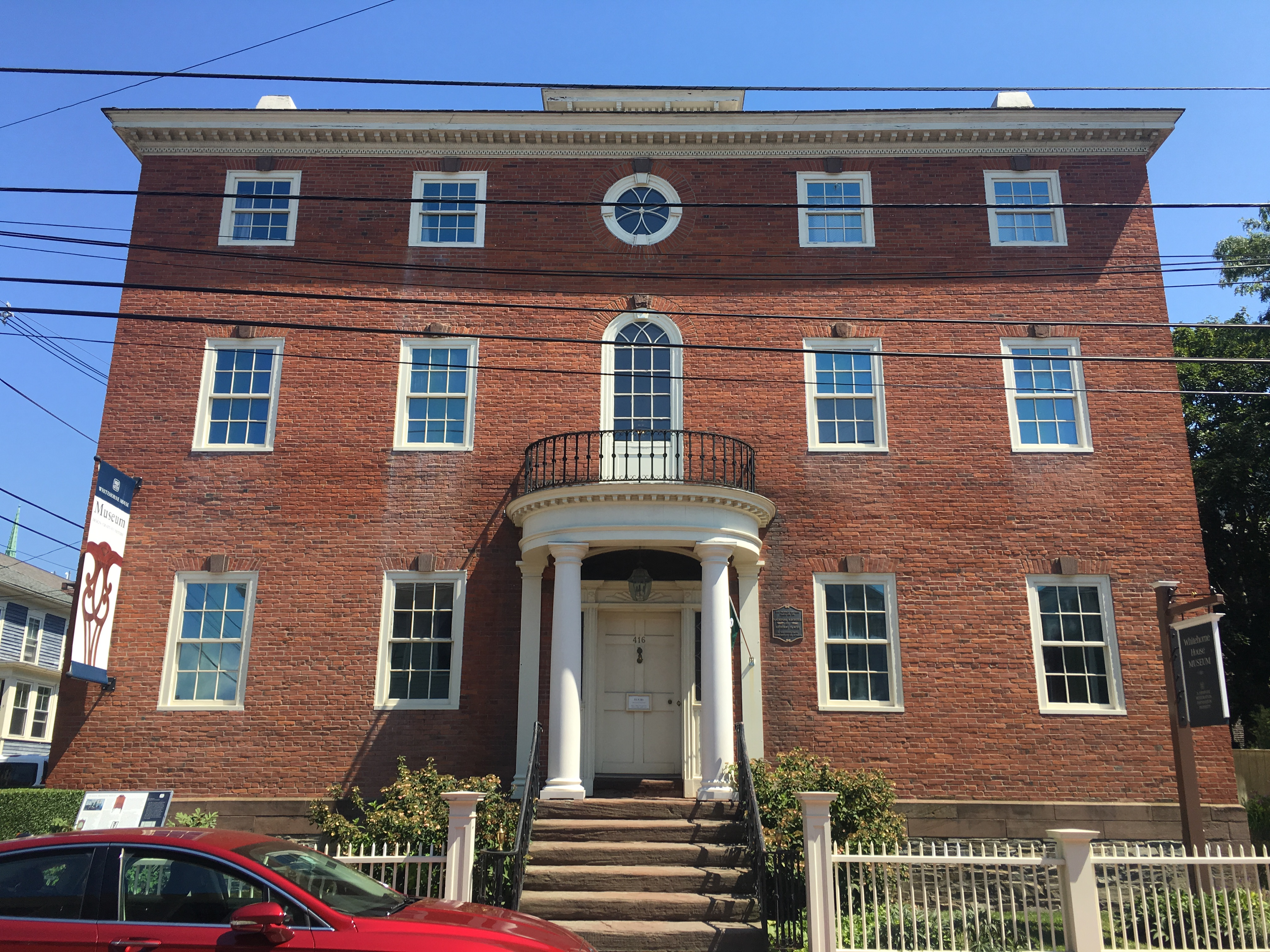
Samuel Whitehorse House in Newport, RI

It was built for Samuel Whitehorne Jr. in 1811 and the exterior feature elegant brick constructionm a hipped roof, decorative entry portico, and a formal garden, which are typical of the Federal Style. It is notable as one of the rare houses to be built in Newport in the Federal Style as the period after the Revolutionary War was a period of slow economic recovery for the city. Interior highlights include a grand central hallway, hand carved details, and a significant collection of early American furniture provided by Doris Duke. It includes examples of the artisans Goddard and Townsend, Benjamin Baker and Holmes Weaver. It is currently owned by the Newport Restoration Foundation

The house was listed on the National Register of Historic Places in 1971.

== See also ==
- National Register of Historic Places listings in Newport County, Rhode Island
