= Emmanuel Church (Newport, Rhode Island) =

Historic church in Rhode Island, United States

- U.S. National Register of Historic Places
- U.S. Historic district – Contributing property
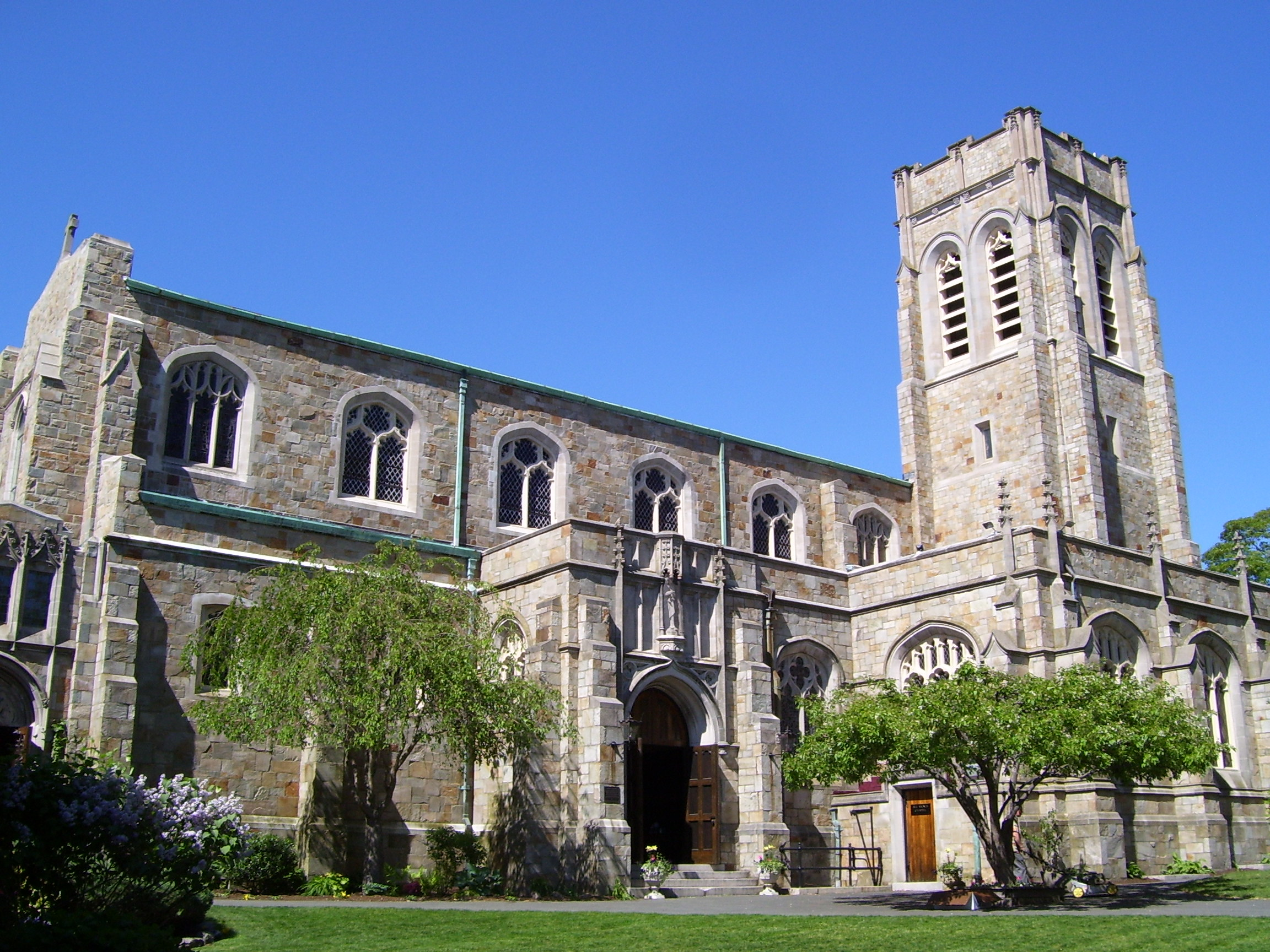
- Emmanuel Church in 2008

- Location within Rhode Island Location within the United States
- Location: 42 Dearborn St., Newport, Rhode Island
- Coordinates: 41°28′46.5″N 71°18′45″W
- Area: less than 1 acre (0.40 ha)
- Built: 1900-1902
- Architect: Cram, Goodhue & Ferguson
- Architectural style: Late Gothic Revival
- Website: emmanuelnewport.org
- Part of: Southern Thames Historic District (ID08000314)
- NRHP reference No.: 96000574

Significant dates
- Added to NRHP: May 16, 1996
- Designated CP: June 26, 2008

Emmanuel Church is an historic Episcopal church at 42 Dearborn Street in Newport, Rhode Island. The church began as a mission of Newport's Trinity Church in 1841. In 1852, it was admitted to the Episcopal Diocese of Rhode Island as Emmanuel Free Church in its own right.

In 2018, the church reported 336 members; in 2023, it reported 144 members. No membership statistics were reported in 2024 national parochial reports. Plate and pledge financial support reported by the church in 2024 was $335,660. Average Sunday Attendance (ASA) reported in 2019 was 88 persons. This was a relative decrease from ASA of 107 persons reported in 2018.

The Rev. Della Wager Wells is the church's rector.

== Building and history ==
The current building was designed by architectural firm Cram, Goodhue & Ferguson in Late Gothic Revival style. It was built between 1900 and 1902, thanks to a donation in memory of John Nicholas Brown I by his widow, Natalie Bayard Brown. Brown donated the reredos and murals in 1921 in honor of Armistice Day. In the early 1930s, E. Power Biggs served as its organist. The building was added to the National Register of Historic Places in 1996.

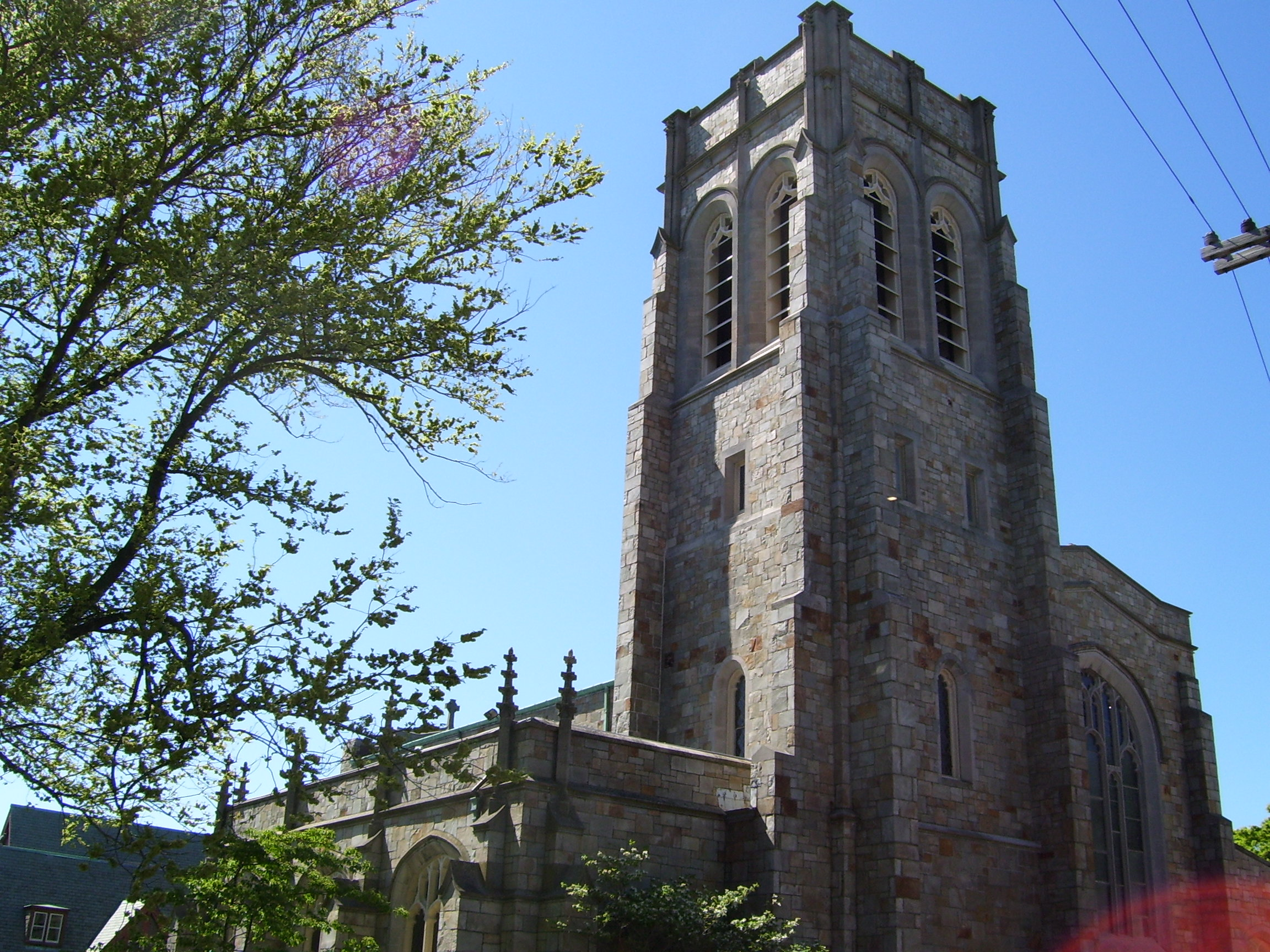
Emmanuel Church in 2008.

== See also ==
- National Register of Historic Places listings in Newport County, Rhode Island
