= Francis Malbone House =

Historic house in Newport, Rhode Island, US

- U.S. National Register of Historic Places
- U.S. National Historic Landmark District – Contributing property
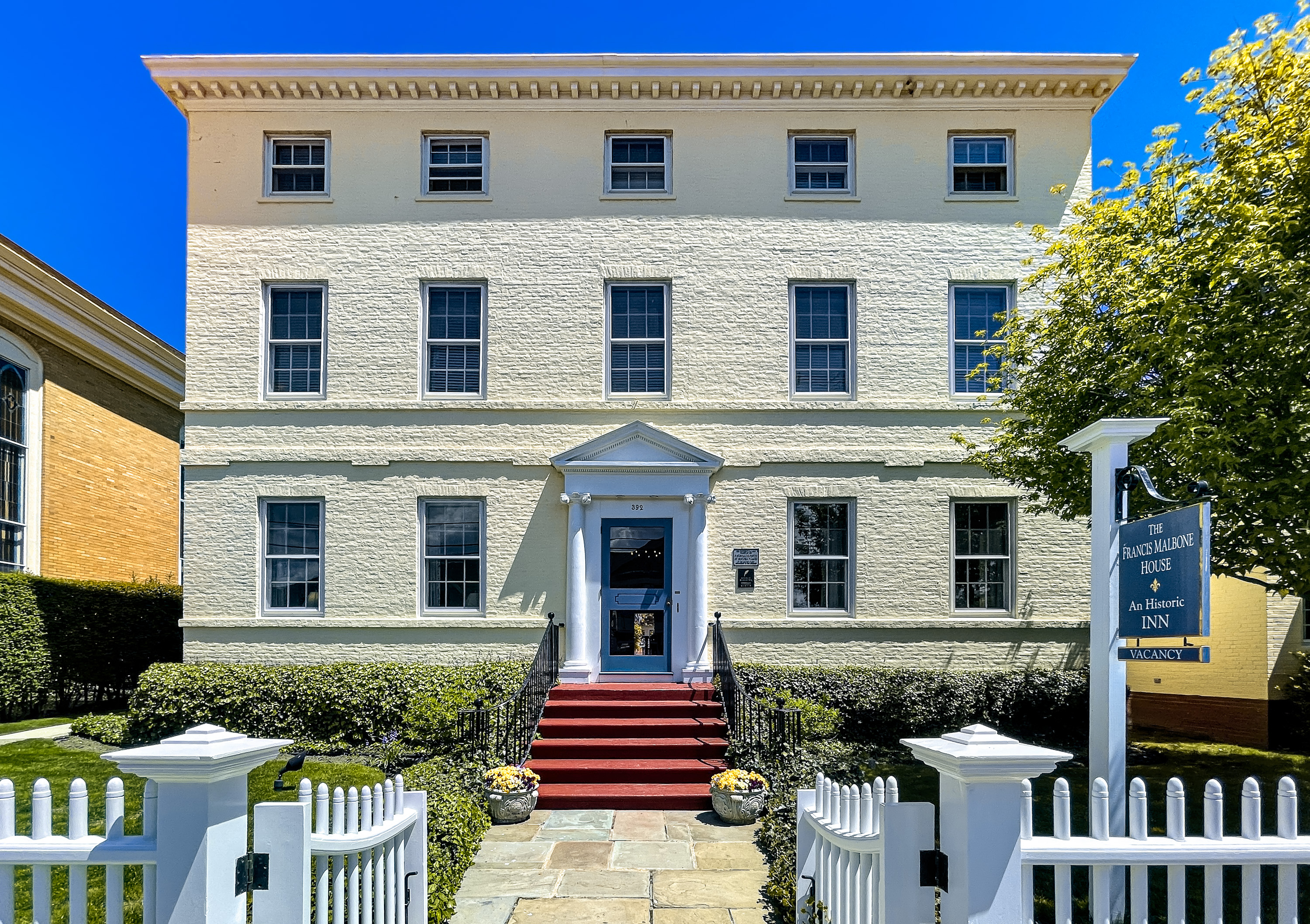

- Location within Rhode Island Location within the United States
- Location: Newport, Rhode Island
- Coordinates: 41°28′58″N 71°18′54″W
- Built: 1758
- Architect: Peter Harrison
- Architectural style: Georgian
- Part of: Newport Historic District (ID68000001)
- NRHP reference No.: 75000055

Significant dates
- Added to NRHP: April 28, 1975
- Designated NHLDCP: November 24, 1968

The Francis Malbone House is a historic house at 392 Thames Street in Newport, Rhode Island.

The house dates from 1760 and its design is attributed to Peter Harrison, a prominent architect of the period, responsible also for the Touro Synagogue and the Redwood Library, both important early Newport buildings.

In 1975 the house was added to the National Register of Historic Places.

== History ==
The building was constructed "in 1760 as a private residence for Colonel Francis Malbone (1728 - 1785), who made his fortune as a shipping merchant at a time when Newport Harbor was one of the busiest Harbors in the New World. He is believed to have smuggled merchandise into the house to avoid taxes. Subterranean passages found in the cellar have been traced to a subway leading to the pier where Colonel Malbone moored his fleet. This was a practice common in the Free Port of Newport, and one upon which many Newport fortunes were founded."

The British occupied Newport during the American Revolution "and seized the Malbone Estate. The mansion was used to store looted gold and treasures, leading to its nickname, "the treasure house.""

After the American Revolution, "the mansion was returned to the Malbone family who retained ownership until the early 1830s. After the death of Colonel Malbone in 1785, his son, also named Francis Malbone, who later became United States Senator, owned the estate until his death in 1809. In 1770, famed painter, Gilbert Stuart painted the portrait of the younger Francis Malbone and his brother Saunders, which now hangs in the Boston Museum of Fine Arts."

In the early 1800s, prior to the building of the famous mansions on Bellevue Avenue, the Malbone House was one of the most opulent houses in Newport. It was owned from 1833 to 1838 by Colonel Joseph G. Totten of the United States Army Corps of Engineers. At that time, Colonel Totten was in charge of the construction of Fort Adams and was also the senior Army engineer in the northeast. He sold the house in 1838 when he was appointed Chief Engineer of the Army.

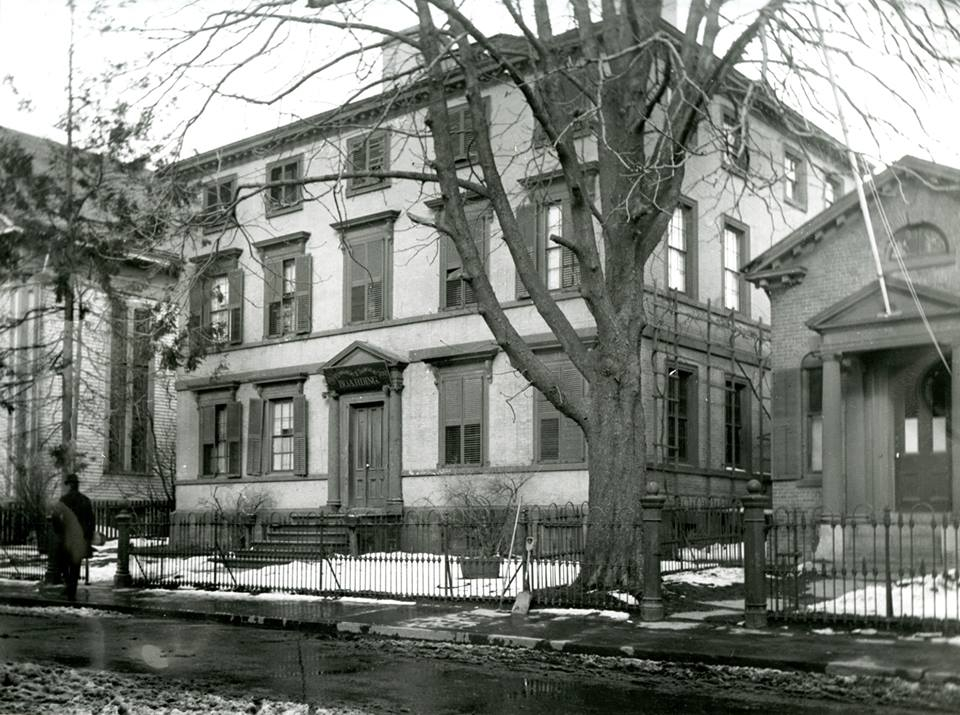
Francis Malbone House, Newport, circa 1888

Dr. James R. Newton owned the house in 1850 and built a brick office on the estate for his doctor's office, now known as "The Counting House".

The Francis Malbone house was restored in the early 1970s. The front door of the mansion features an Ionic doorway very similar to the Ionic portico of the Touro Synagogue. The floor plan features a broad central hall with flanking rooms on either side. The hall has a high divided arch, the stairs are fitted with ramped rail and twisted balusters. The stair landing is lit by a Palladian window. The front parlors feature plush paneling, a sign of wealth in colonial times. Two-story pediment mantels adorn the fireplace walls and a broken scroll tops the one in the northwest parlor.

In 1989, the house was converted to an inn, with nine guest rooms. In 1996, a "sensitively designed addition" was built, allowing the inn to expand to eighteen guestrooms.

== See also ==
- Southern Thames Historic District
- National Register of Historic Places listings in Newport County, Rhode Island
