= Admiral Fitzroy Inn =

- U.S. National Historic Landmark District – Contributing property
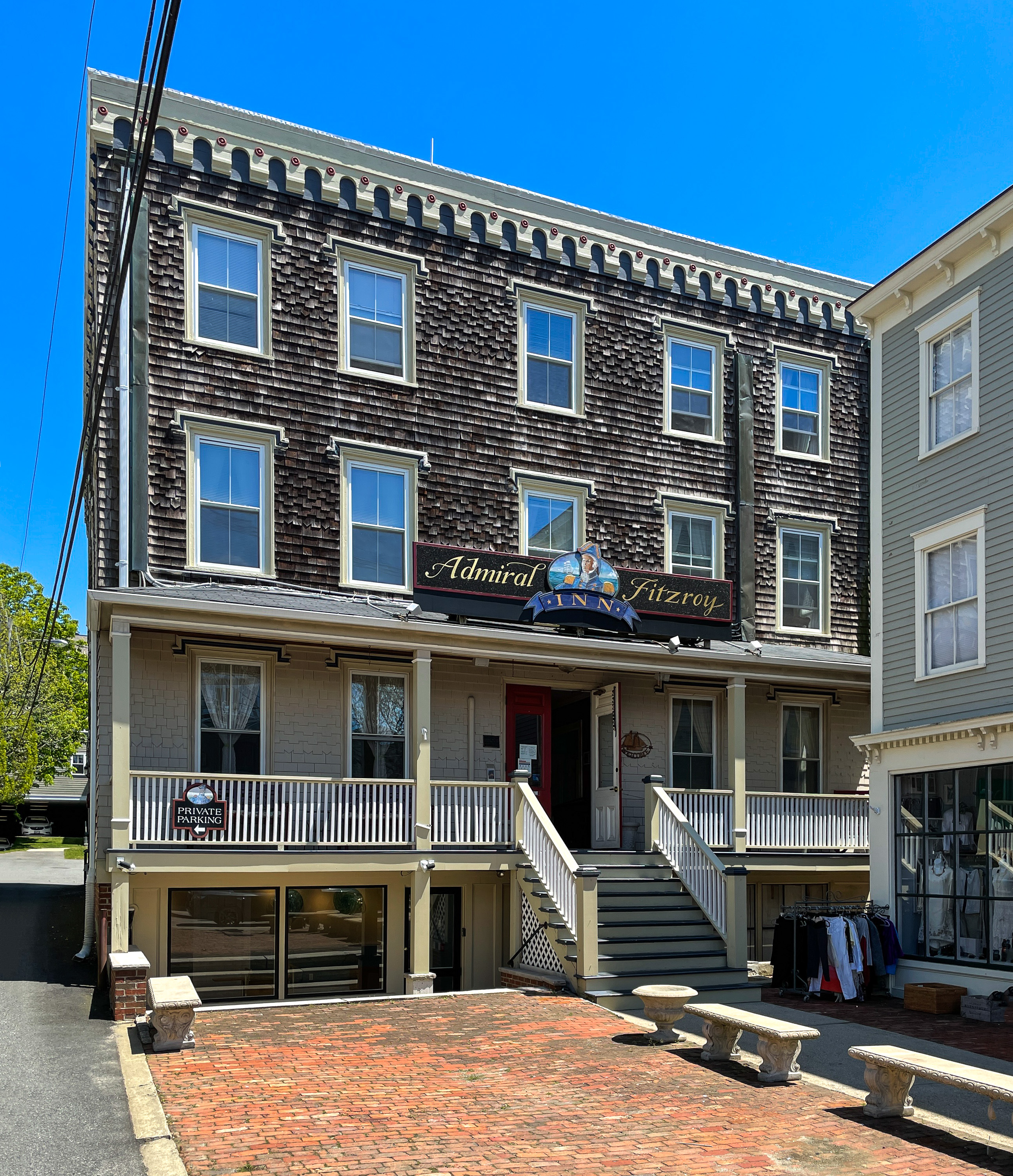

- Location within Rhode Island Location within the United States
- Location: 398 Thames Street Newport, RI
- Coordinates: 41.482505°N 71.314199°W
- Built: 1854
- Architect: Dudly Newton
- Architectural style: Gothic Revival, Italianate
- Part of: Newport Historic District (ID68000001)
- Designated NHLDCP: November 24, 1968

The Admiral Fitzroy Inn is located at 398 Thames Street in Newport, Rhode Island, in the Newport Historic District. It is named for Vice-Admiral Robert FitzRoy and was built in 1854.

== History ==
It was designed by architect Dudley Newton, and built in 1854. It served as the home of the Sisters of Mercy Convent for nuns of St. Mary's church from 1854 to 1924, and later housed the first private Catholic school in Rhode Island, St Mary's Academy from 1854 to 1924. Jacqueline Bouvier and future U.S. President John F. Kennedy were married in St Mary's Church.

In 1986, the building was dismantled and moved from the original site, two blocks away on Spring Street, to the current location of 398 Thames Street. It now serves as the Admiral Fitzroy Inn.

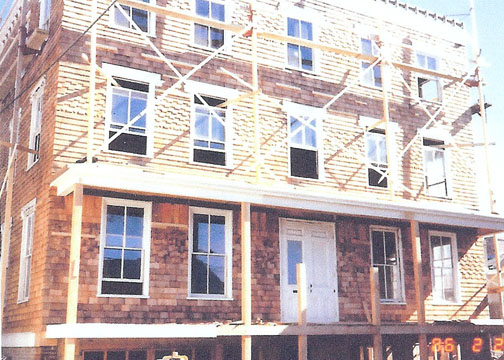
1986 renovation

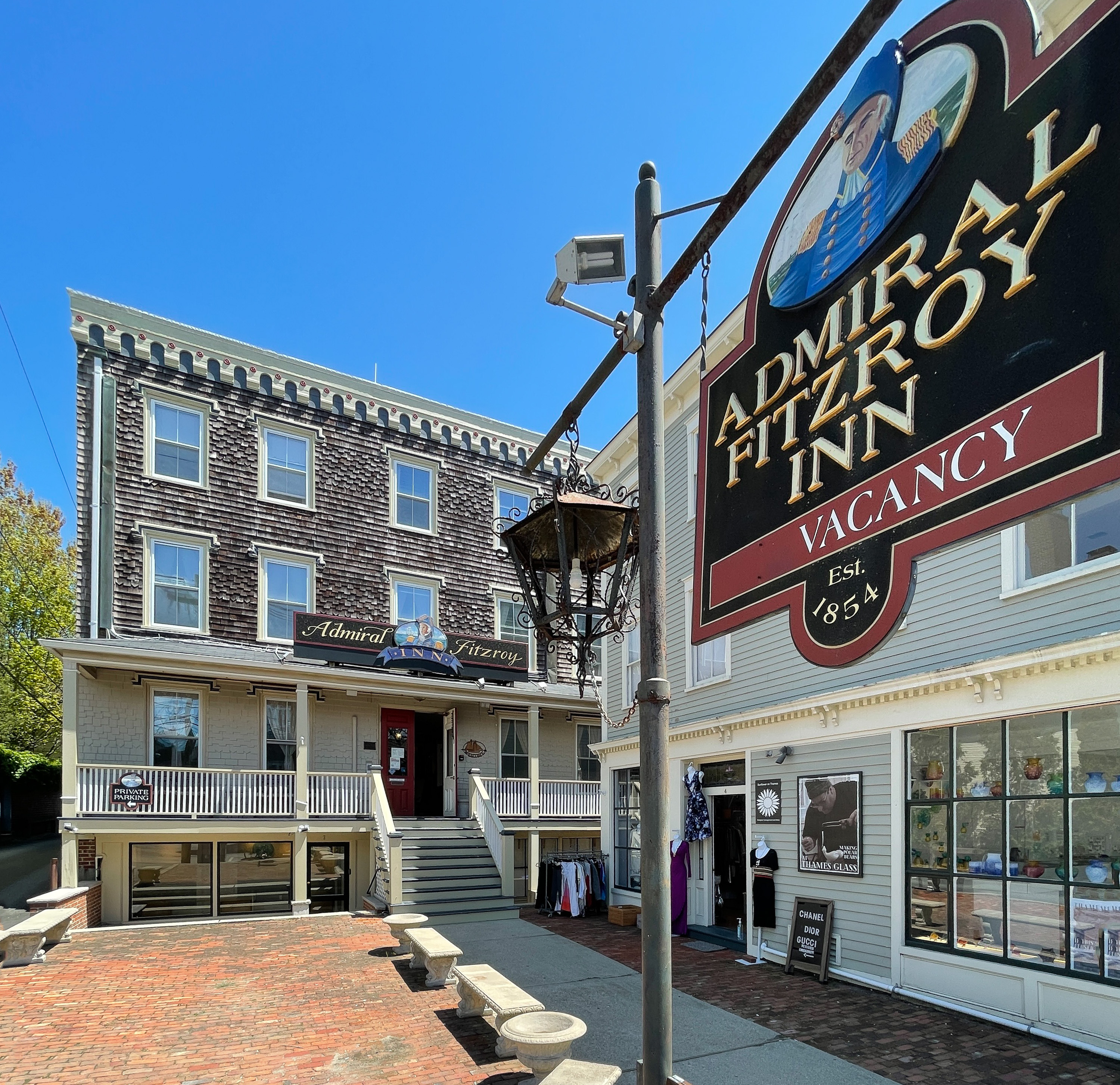
Sign

== Architectural style ==
The principal architectural style is Gothic, and the secondary is Italianate (according to the Historic Building Data Sheet Rhode Island Statewide Survey Phase 1 and the National Register of Historic Places nomination form for Newport Historic District).

== Features ==
The eighteen rooms have decorative hand-painted walls. The Admiral Fitzroy Inn also has a conference room, a rooftop deck for guests, a small dining room, and a view of the ocean. There is off-street parking for guests. There are some antiques displayed including an original Admiral Fitzroy Barometer that hangs in the lobby.
