= Clarke Cooke House =

- Clark Cook House
- Formerly listed on the U.S. National Register of Historic Places
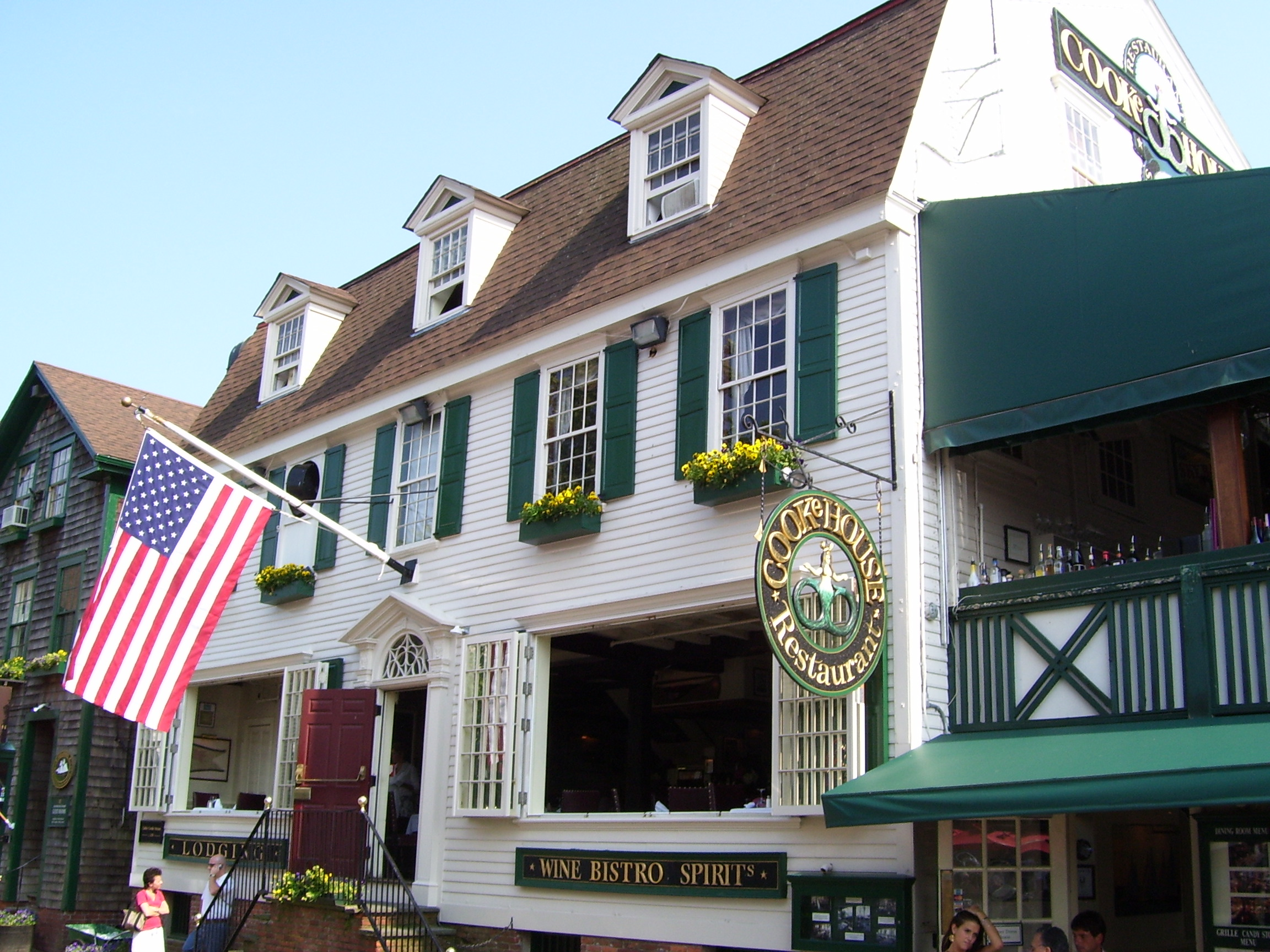
- Clark Cooke House in 2008

- Location within Rhode Island Location within the United States
- Location: Newport, Rhode Island
- Coordinates: 41.48617°N 71.31587°W
- Built: 1780
- NRHP reference No.: 72001571

Significant dates
- Added to NRHP: 1972
- Removed from NRHP: 1973

Clarke Cooke House (also known as Clark Cooke House or Clark Cook House) is a historic colonial house and restaurant on Bannister's Wharf at 285 Thames Street in Newport, Rhode Island.

== History ==
In 1780, Clarke Cooke, a wealthy Newport sea captain built the house nearby on Thames Street, opposite what is now the Blues Cafe, before eventually moving from Thames Street as it commercialized. In the 1970s David W. Ray purchased the building and moved it over a sixth month period in 1973 to Bannister's Wharf. The second and third floors of the building are original (while the first had been used for various commercial purposes) and these top "floors were jacked up, moved and set on a new foundation, which is now the wharf level dining area." It was added to the National Register of Historic Places in 1972, but was removed in 1973 after being relocated.

== See also ==
- Colonial history of the United States
