= Newport Steam Factory =

- U.S. National Register of Historic Places
- U.S. Historic district – Contributing property
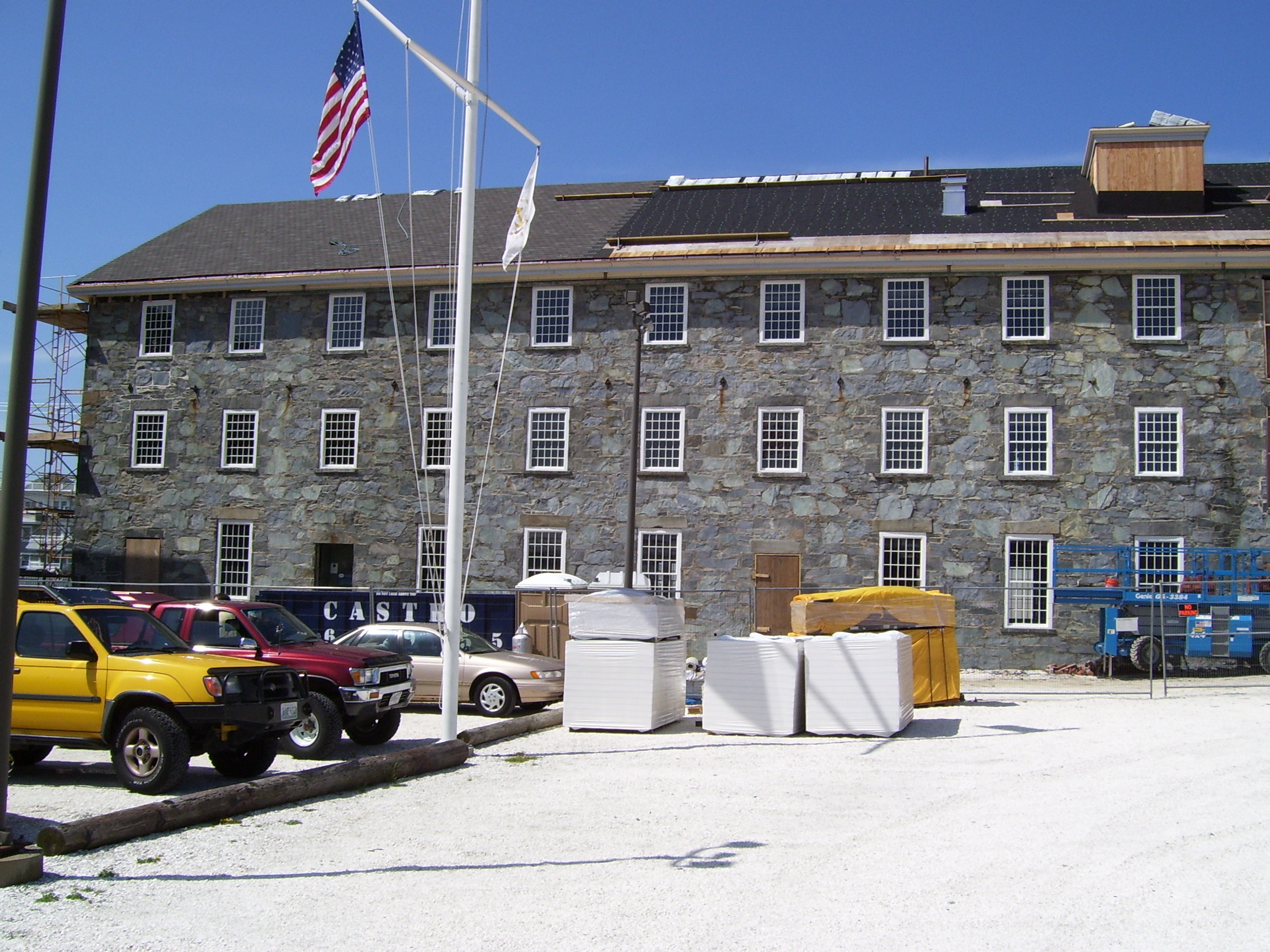

- Location within Rhode Island Location within the United States
- Location: Newport, Rhode Island
- Coordinates: 41°29′3″N 71°18′58″W
- Built: 1831
- Part of: Southern Thames Historic District (ID08000314)
- NRHP reference No.: 72000030

Significant dates
- Added to NRHP: January 20, 1972
- Designated CP: June 26, 2008

The Newport Steam Factory is an historic building at 449 Thames Street in Newport, Rhode Island. It is a 3 1/2-story stone structure, 120 feet (37 m) by 48 feet (15 m). It was built in 1831 by a group of local businessmen in an effort to boost the local economy, which had suffered since the British occupation during the American Revolutionary War. The building was used as a cotton mill until 1857. In 1892 it was purchased by the Newport Illuminating Company. It is now part of the International Yacht Restoration School.

The building was listed on the National Register of Historic Places in 1972.

== See also ==
- National Register of Historic Places listings in Newport County, Rhode Island
