= Thames Street, Rhode Island =

Street in Newport, Rhode Island

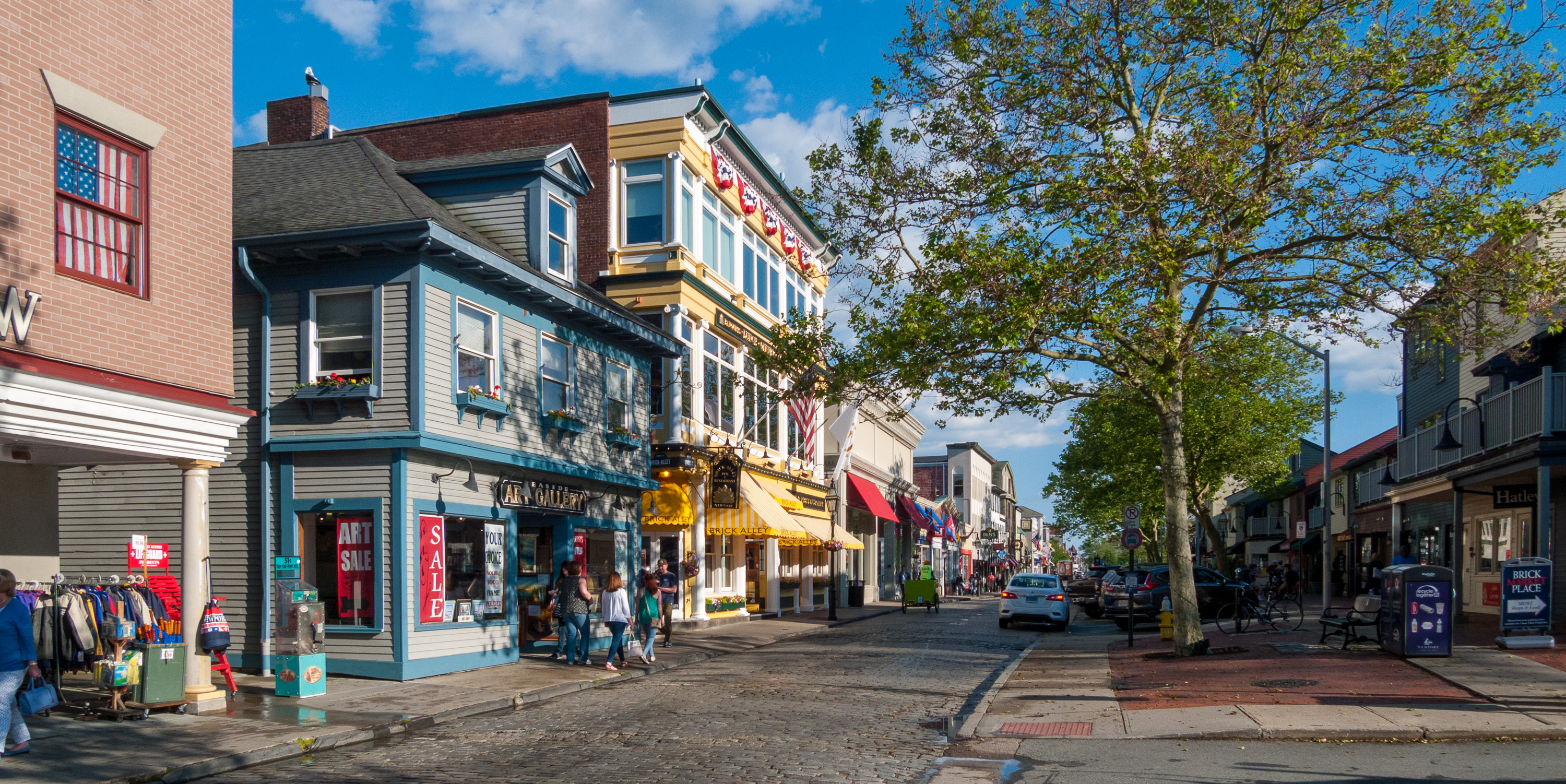
Shops along Thames Street

Thames Street is a historic street in Newport, Rhode Island that is one of the oldest continuously used streets in the state. It remains the primary street in downtown Newport and runs parallel along the waterfront.

== History ==
Thames Street (along with Marlborough Street) was one of Newport's original two streets officially laid out in Newport in 1654 and providing access to the city's many wharfs. The street takes its name from the River Thames in London, England, an area from which many of the early colonists migrated. The northern part of Thames Street originates near the Common Burying Ground and passes through several blocks of what was in the seventeenth and eighteenth centuries a Quaker settlement in the area near Easton's Point. Dozens of colonial buildings survive along the street and many are still used for commercial purposes. The southern part of Thames Street was historically home to a large Irish population in the nineteenth and twentieth centuries.

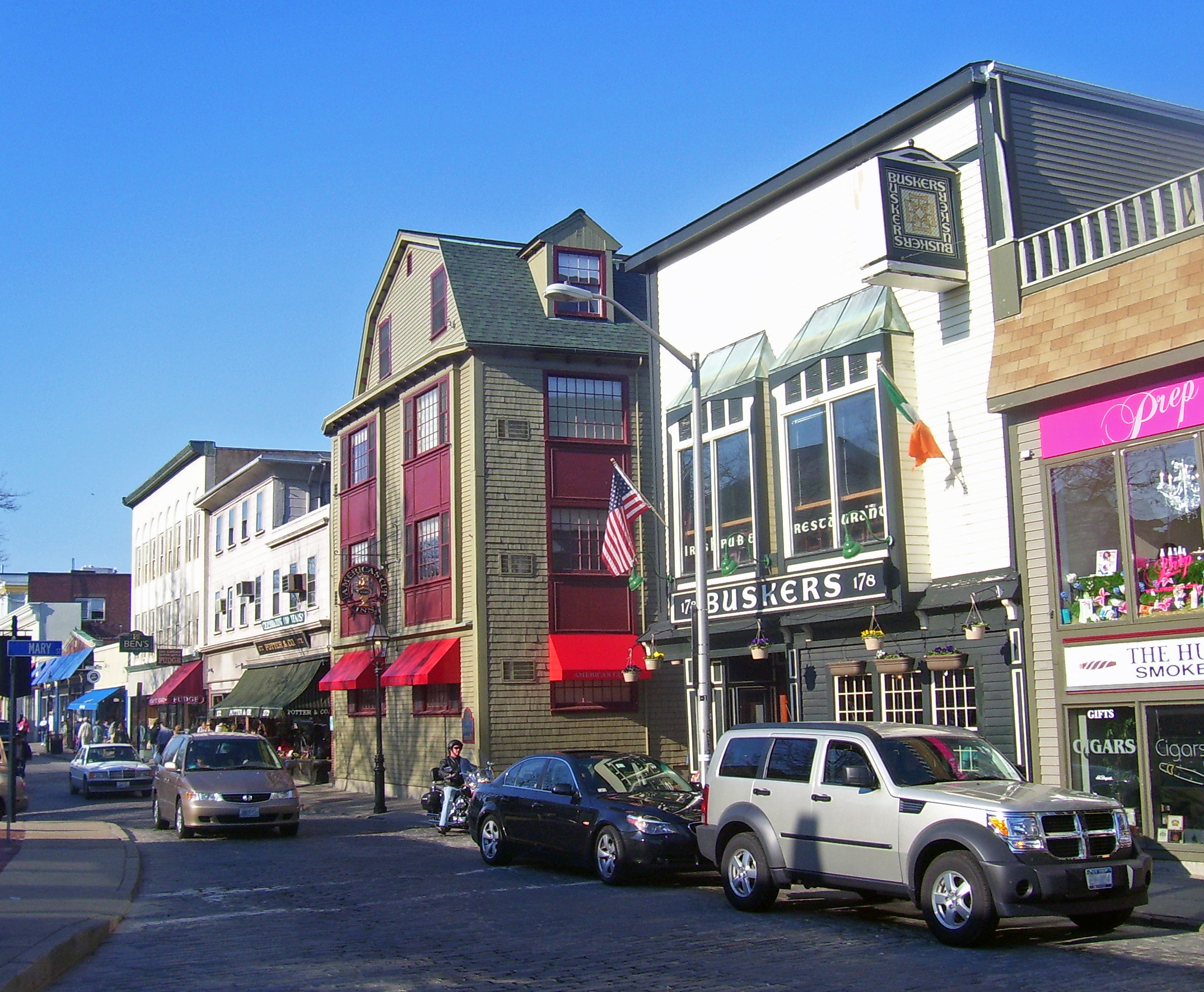
Shops along Thames Street

Today local residents pronounce the street name with a soft "th" and which rhymes with "names" rather than the British pronunciation of "temz." Today Thames Street remains the main street in downtown Newport today and numerous restaurants, inns and stores abut it.

== Length ==
Thames Street runs for 1.5 miles (2 kilometers) through the center of Newport, beginning at Ellery Park at the intersection of Poplar and Farewell Streets and ending in the "Fifth Ward" neighborhood at the intersection of Morton Avenue and Carroll Avenue. It is a one-way southbound road for most of its length, with two exceptions.

There are three sections of the street: The first runs from Ellery Park to West Marlborough Street through the city's Kerry Hill neighborhood. The second, known to locals as "Upper Thames", runs from West Marlborough to the city Post Office at the intersection of Memorial Boulevard and America's Cup Avenue. The street is paved with stone blocks (cobble stones) from the intersection with Touro Street until the post office. Upper Thames is a one-way street, but switches directions from southbound to northbound at the intersection with Mill Street. The third portion is known as "Lower Thames" and runs from Perry Mill at the America's Cup Avenue intersection until the road's termination. Lower Thames is one-way southbound until West Narragansett Avenue, where it becomes a two-way road for the remainder of its length.

== Sites on Thames Street ==
- Admiral Fitzroy Inn (1854)
- Charles Tillinghast House (1715)
- Clarke Cooke House (1780)
- Francis Malbone House (1758)
- International Yacht Restoration School
- The John Stevens Shop (ca. 1750)
- Museum of Newport History (Market House) (1762)
- Newport Historic District (Rhode Island)
- Newport Steam Factory (1831)
- Perry Mill (1835)
- Samuel Whitehorne House (1811)
- Southern Thames Historic District
