= IYRS School of Technology & Trades =

Coordinates: 41°28′51.47″N 71°18′53.25″W

IYRS campus

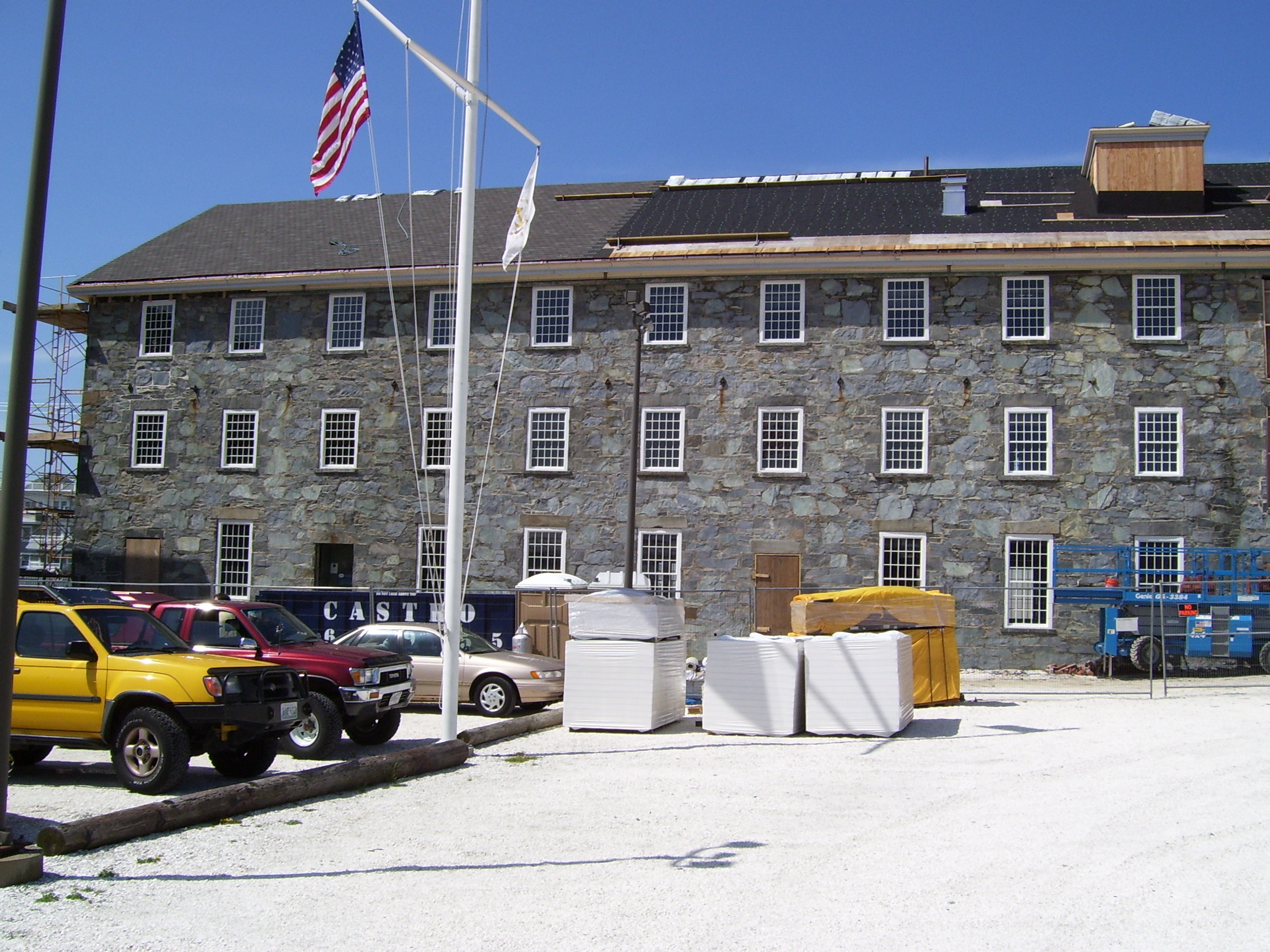
1831 stone Newport Steam Factory

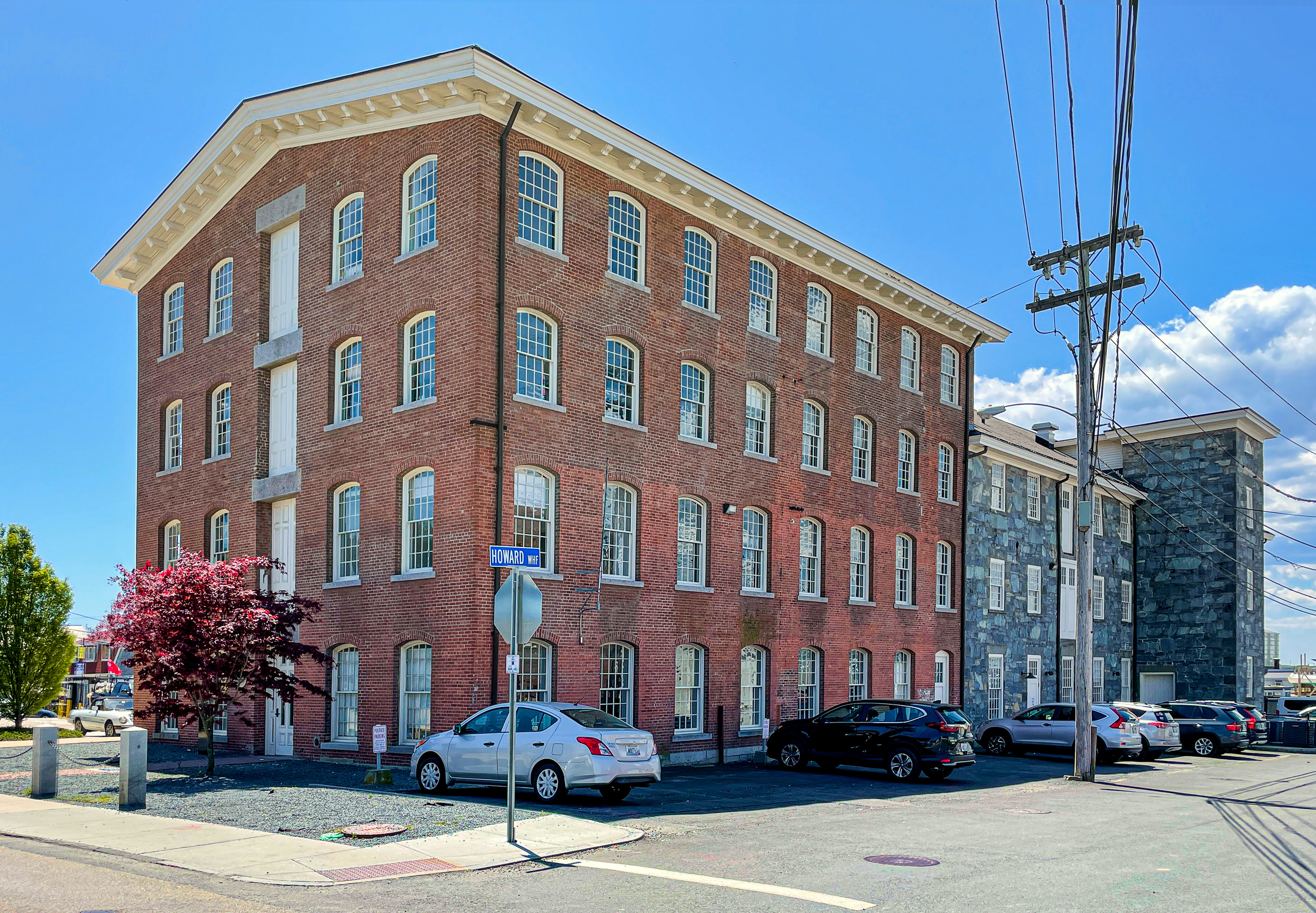
1831 John Mecray Aquidneck Mill Building, restored 2009

IYRS School of Technology & Trades (known as IYRS, from its previous name of the International Yacht Restoration School) is a private nonprofit school with a 3-acre campus on Thames Street in Newport, Rhode Island. IYRS focuses on training highly skilled craftspeople and technicians for careers in a wide range of industries.

Currently four accredited programs are offered in Digital Modeling & Fabrication, Composites Technology, Boatbuilding & Restoration, and Marine Systems. The school is planning to introduce additional programs based on the same model. IYRS programs focus on making, building, restoring, and maintaining, using both traditional and modern materials from wood to composites and carbon fiber. Programs are accredited by the ACCSC and qualified applicants are eligible for federal financial aid and veterans' benefits for post-secondary education.

In 1993, the marine artist John Mecray, philanthropist Elizabeth Meyer, who restored the J-Class yacht Endeavor, and several others founded the school on a 1-hectare property on the Newport waterfront. Today, the school owns several large buildings, including the 1831 stone Newport Steam Factory building listed on the National Register of Historic Places. From 1995 to 2006 major restoration work on the Coronet took place at the school.
