= Southern Thames Historic District =

Historic district in Rhode Island, United States

- U.S. National Register of Historic Places
- U.S. Historic district
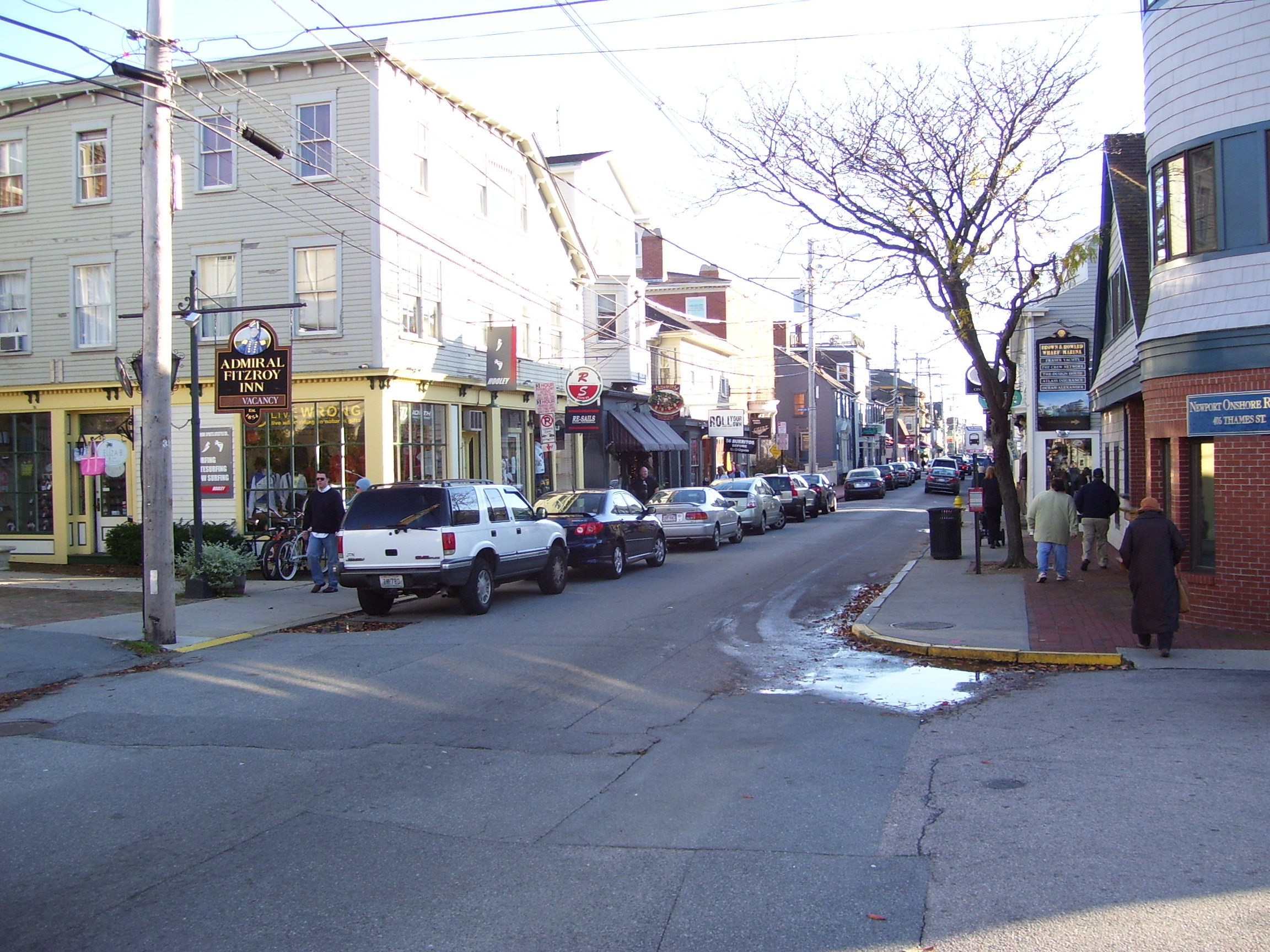
- Thames Street in 2008

- Location within Rhode Island Location within the United States
- Location: Thames St. from Memorial Blvd. to Morton Ave., Newport, Rhode Island
- Coordinates: 41°29′9″N 71°18′53″W
- Area: 135 acres (55 ha)
- Built: C 1825, C 1845 and C 1880
- Architect: Cram, Ralph Adams; et al.
- Architectural style: Colonial and Federal
- NRHP reference No.: 08000314
- Added to NRHP: June 26, 2008

The Southern Thames Historic District encompasses the commercial and residential area immediately to the south of the colonial center of Newport, Rhode Island. This area, covering about 135 acres (55 ha), was developed both residentially and commercially between about 1850 and 1920, with the majority of its growth coming in the late 19th century. It is characterized by densely built streets, including Thames Street, Newport's major north–south thoroughfare. The district includes the southern portion of Newport's waterfront, extending south from Memorial Boulevard along Thames and Spring Streets to Morton Street, and west to Marchant Street in its southernmost section. The district's housing stock and commercial architecture are largely vernacular wood-frame structures, set close to the sidewalk on small lots. The waterfront area is composed of wharves with warehouses and other structures, many of which have been converted to commercial use. One of the most prominent buildings in the district is the Emmanuel Episcopal Church, designed by Ralph Adams Cram and built in 1912–13.

The district was listed on the National Register of Historic Places in 2008. The northern portion of the district (from Pope Street north), is also listed as part of the Newport Historic District, a National Historic Landmark District.

== See also ==
- National Register of Historic Places listings in Newport County, Rhode Island
