= Washington Square (Newport, Rhode Island) =

Intersection of major streets in Newport, Rhode Island

Coordinates: 41.4902°N 71.3140°W

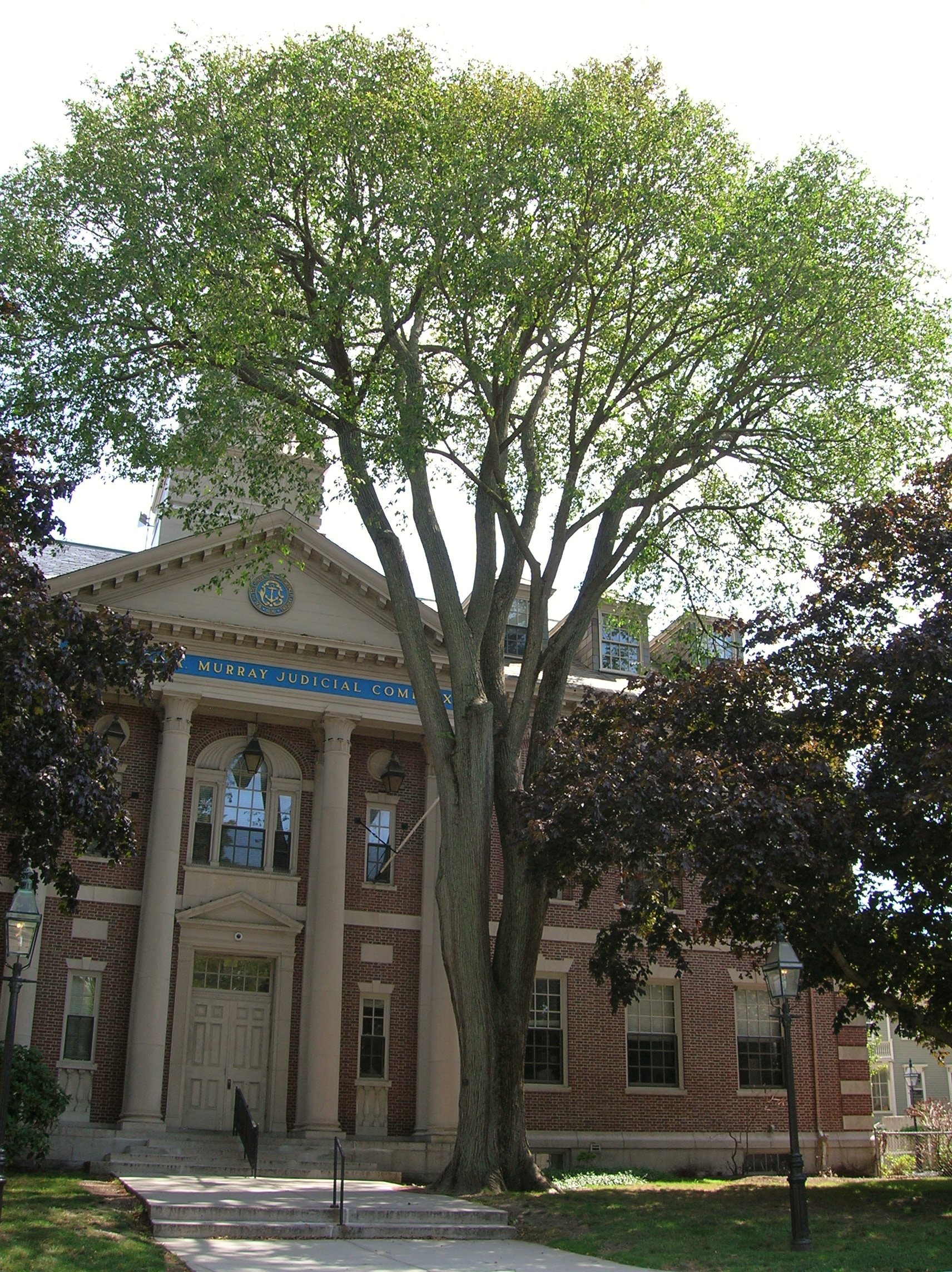
Elm tree in front of the Florence K. Murray Judicial Complex in Washington Square

Washington Square is the geographical and historical heart of Newport Rhode Island. More trapezoid than square, it exists at the intersection of several major streets and what was the colonial long wharf, projecting into the harbor off Aquidneck Island and into Narragansett Bay. Although as a civic space it is colonial in origin, dating back to the first settlement of 1639, much of its present shape, form and name dates from the 19th century while a number of its most prominent buildings are of early 20th century design. Like many civic spaces, it developed over time rather than being imposed by design.

== History ==
The first group of Anglo settlers – among them William Coddington, John Clarke, Henry Bull, and the Easton family each clustered their house lots of about ten acres close to a fresh water spring and a short distance uphill from the shoreline. The spring still flows (although its course is now subterranean) but all the original houses are gone, the last, Henry Bull's, being destroyed by fire in 1912.

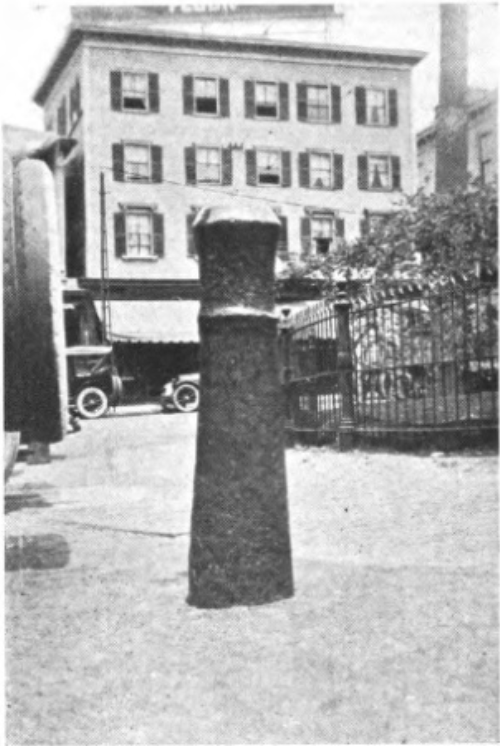
Cannon of brig Tartar, commander Captain Daniel Fones, Washington Square (c.1922); removed to the Newport Historical Society

What remains from the areas 17th-century origins are adjacent street names (Coddington, Bull, Clarke, Dyer) and the street layout itself. Vectors lead along the residential hill and harbor (Thames Street, Spring Street), up island (Broadway) and northwest, out of town, toward the Common Burying Ground established by the 1660s (the aptly named cortege route of Farewell Street). These don't quite converge at the square but instead enter at various points onto an open space flanked by both residential and institutional buildings. By the nineteenth century, this spot came to be known as "The Parade" and became a more defined, park-like area with boundary fencing, trees, fountain and a bronze sculpture of one of Newport's military heroes, Oliver Hazard Perry.

Two of colonial America's most significant buildings are at either end of the square, Newport's Colony House, built by Richard Munday (1739) and the Brick Market designed by Peter Harrison (1772); as a public space, this "square" contained two important civic symbols: the impressively ornate seat of the colonial government and a fashionable Georgian symbol of Newport's economic success.

From 1995 to the present, Washington Square has been revitalized by The Washington Square Advisory Commission. Building on an original design by artist, inventor and restorer Howard Newman, the commission completely rebuilt the square to more closely serve its original function as a gathering place for Newport's citizenry, and dedicating itself to the square's continued historic, architectural, cultural, and commercial significance. To accomplish the goals, the traffic pattern was re-designed, and a 19th-century horse trough fountain was commissioned, recreated and installed as its focal point by Newmans Ltd., which recreated the trough in bronze, based on archival photographs from the library of the Newport Historical Society.

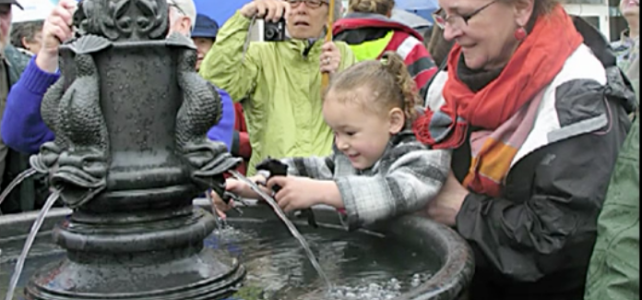
Horse Trough Fountain at Washington Square

There are plans and proposals to continue to renovate the square today, but while other areas of Newport have become better known because of tourist marketing, Washington Square has long been the hometown "hearth" of the city. One testament to that status were the old Homecoming events, welcoming all native to Newport during which a triumphal arch was set up in the square and scores of former residents gathered to celebrate their hometown.

== See also ==
Newport Rhode Island
