= Newport Historic District (Rhode Island) =

Historic district in Rhode Island, United States

- U.S. National Register of Historic Places
- U.S. National Historic Landmark District
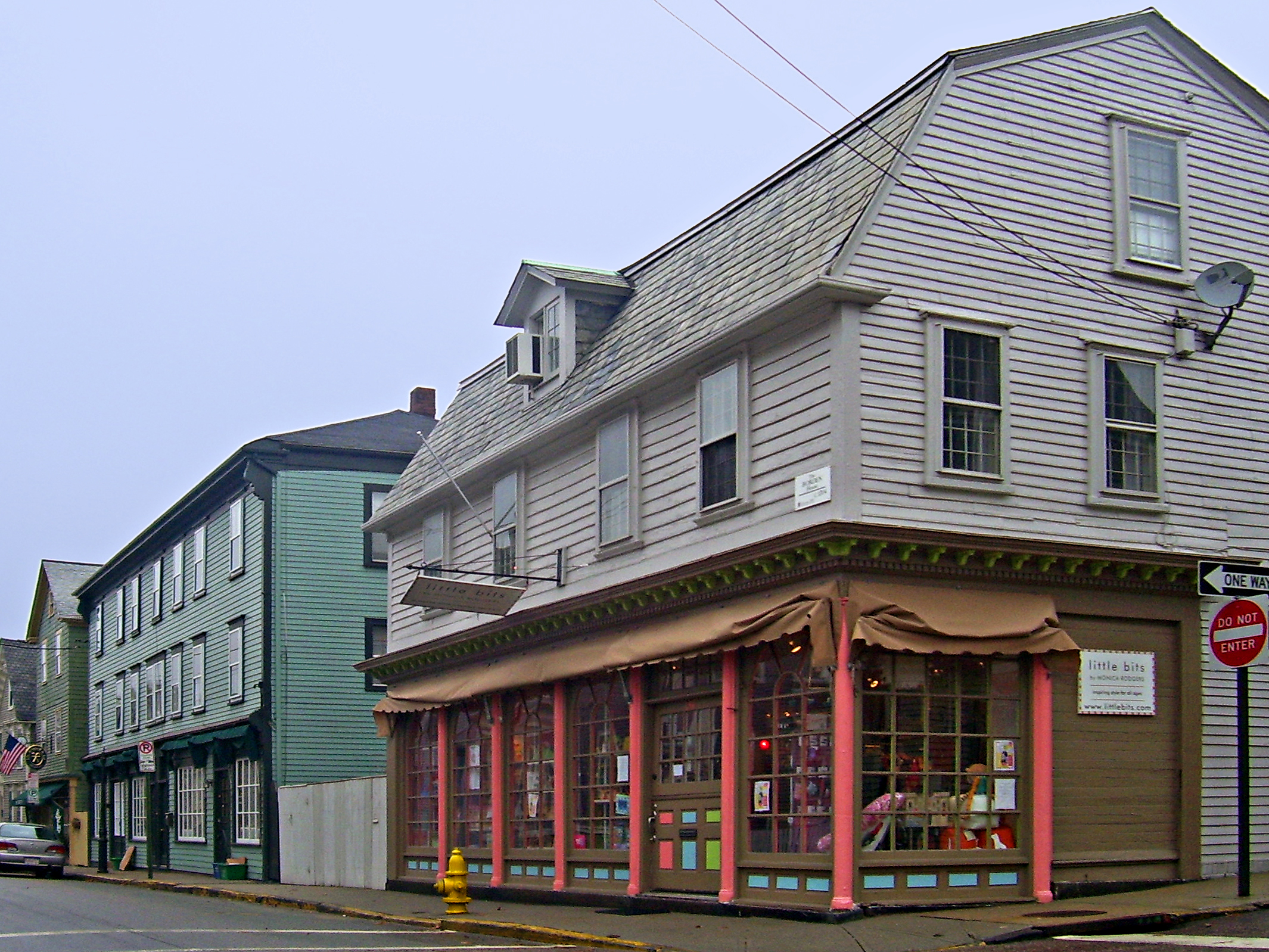
- Colonial architecture at Spring and Church Streets, 2008

- Location within Rhode Island Location within the United States
- Location: Newport, RI
- Coordinates: 41°29′24″N 71°18′49″W
- Area: 250 acres (100 ha)
- Built: late 17th-late 19th century
- Architectural style: Georgian, Colonial, mix of later styles
- NRHP reference No.: 68000001

Significant dates
- Added to NRHP: November 24, 1968
- Designated NHLD: November 24, 1968

The Newport Historic District is a historic district that covers 250 acres (100 ha) in the center of Newport in the U.S. state of Rhode Island. It was designated a National Historic Landmark (NHL) in 1968 due to its extensive and well-preserved assortment of intact colonial buildings dating from the early and mid-18th century. Six of those buildings are themselves NHLs in their own right, including the city's oldest house and the former meeting place of the colonial and state legislatures. Newer and modern buildings coexist with the historic structures.

It is a major tourist attraction due to its history, its setting on Newport's waterfront and the shops located within it along Thames Street. In 1997, it doubled for mid-19th-century New Haven, Connecticut during the production of Steven Spielberg's Amistad. "No comparable collection of colonial buildings exists today in the state or perhaps the nation", says Rhode Island historian William McLoughlin.

== Geography ==
The district is described by the National Register of Historic Places (NRHP) as being roughly bounded by Van Zandt Avenue to the north; Farewell, Sherman, High and Thomas streets on the east; Golden Hill, Thames and Marsh streets in the south and Washington Street on the west, just before the shores of Narragansett Bay. This area includes the Easton's Point neighborhood and its concentration of colonial houses on the north, Washington Square, the shops and stores along Thames Street near the waterfront, and the blocks inland up the gentle rise to the Bellevue Avenue neighborhoods.

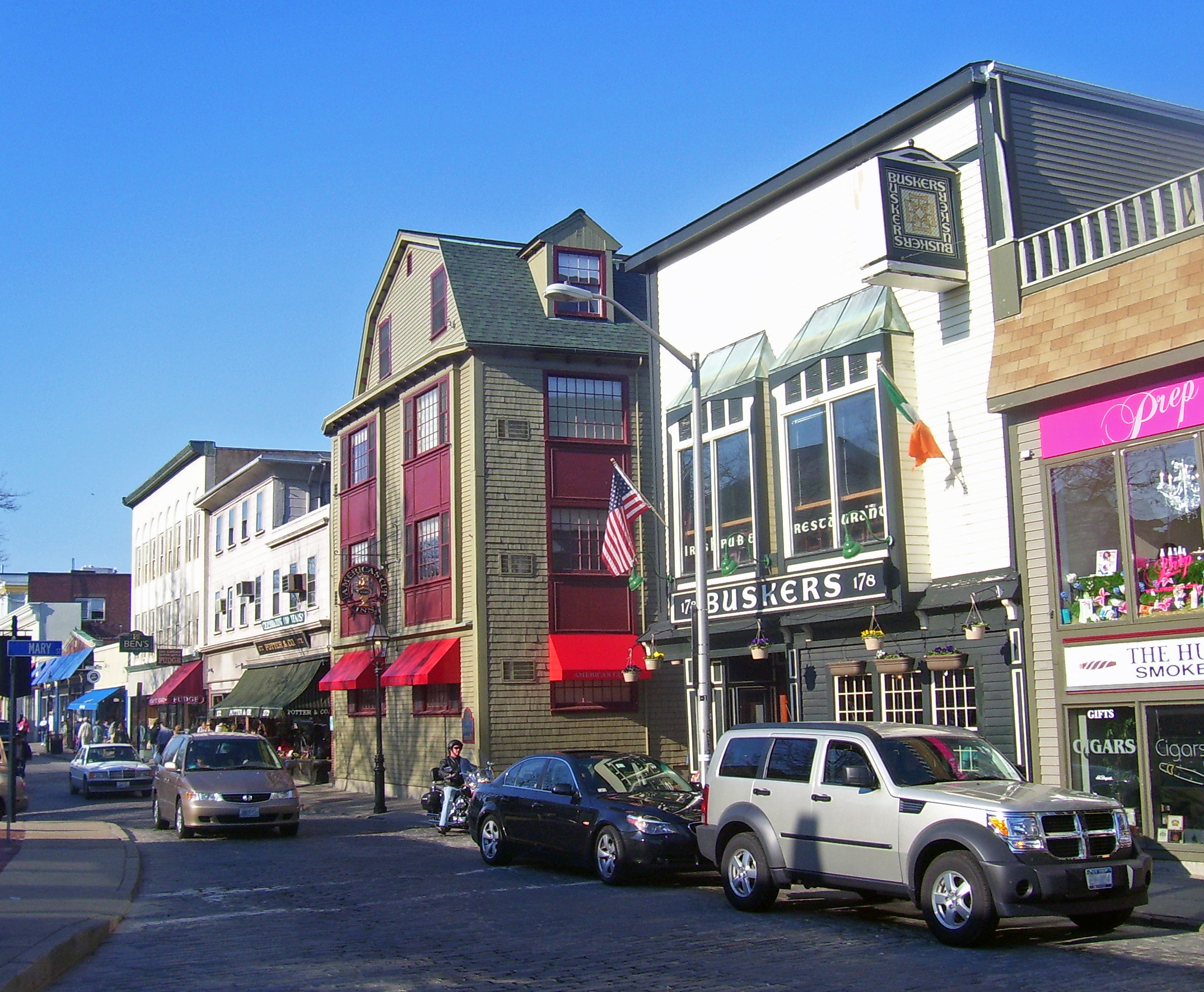
Shops along Thames Street

Land use varies from commercial, mainly street-level retailing, along heavily trafficked Thames and America's Cup Avenue to primarily residential along the side streets to the east. The narrowness of these streets, built long before the automobile, has led the city to restrict parking along them to residents with a valid permit.

In 2007 the city proposed increasing the district's boundaries to include the ten-acre (4 ha) common burial ground at the north end, which dates to 1660. As of 2008 the National Park Service has not announced whether it will approve the request.

== History ==
Buildings and structures

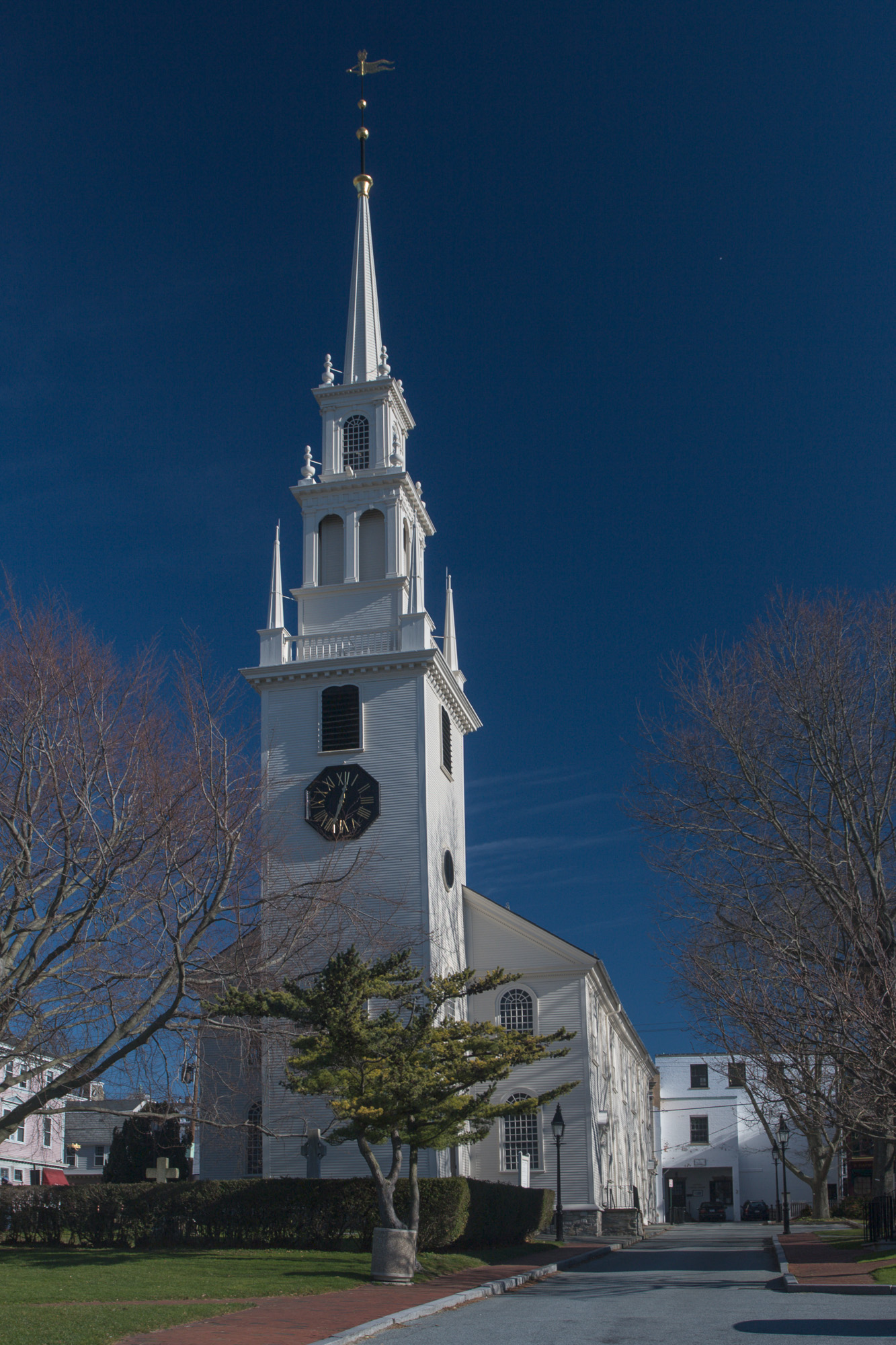
Trinity Church

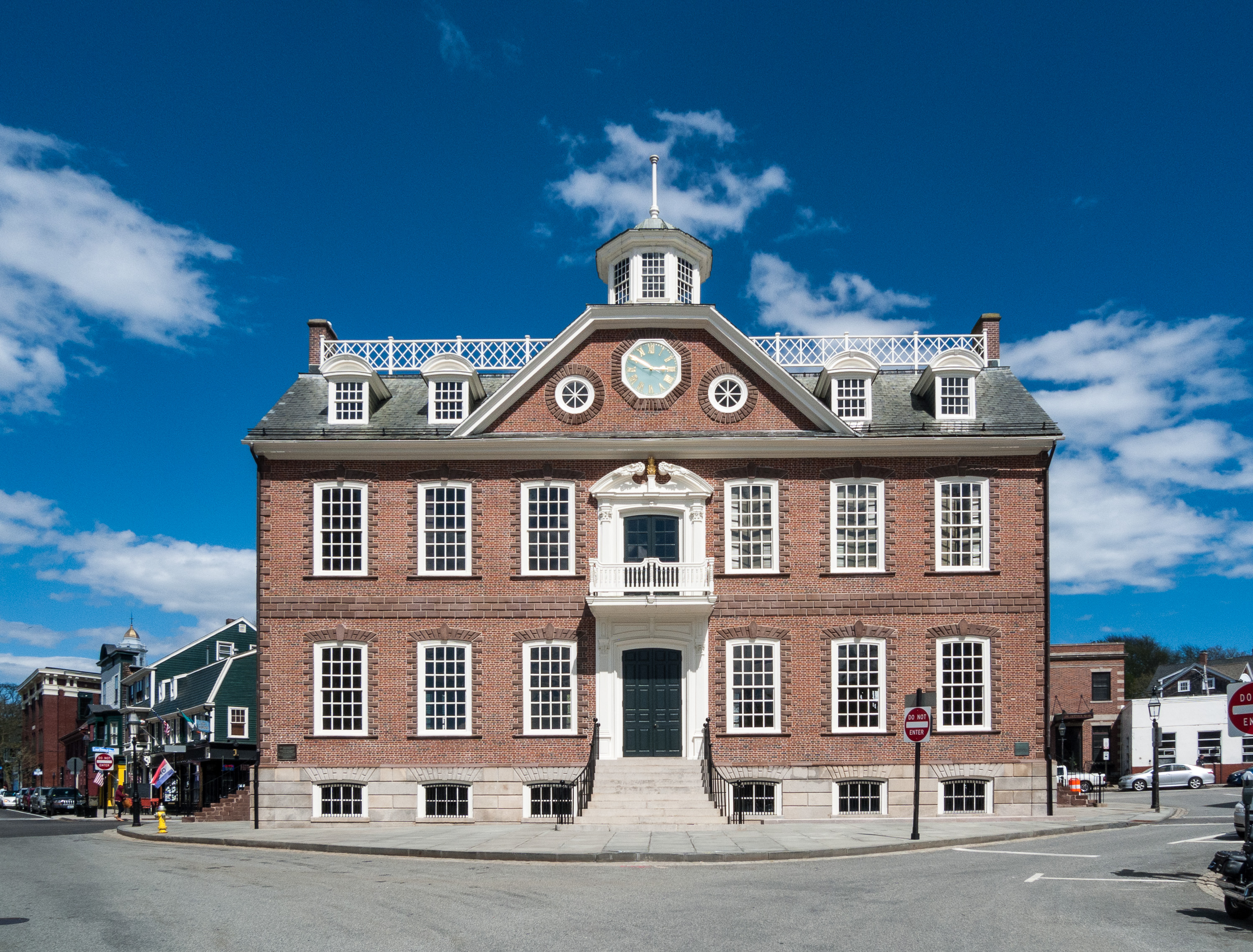
Old Colony House

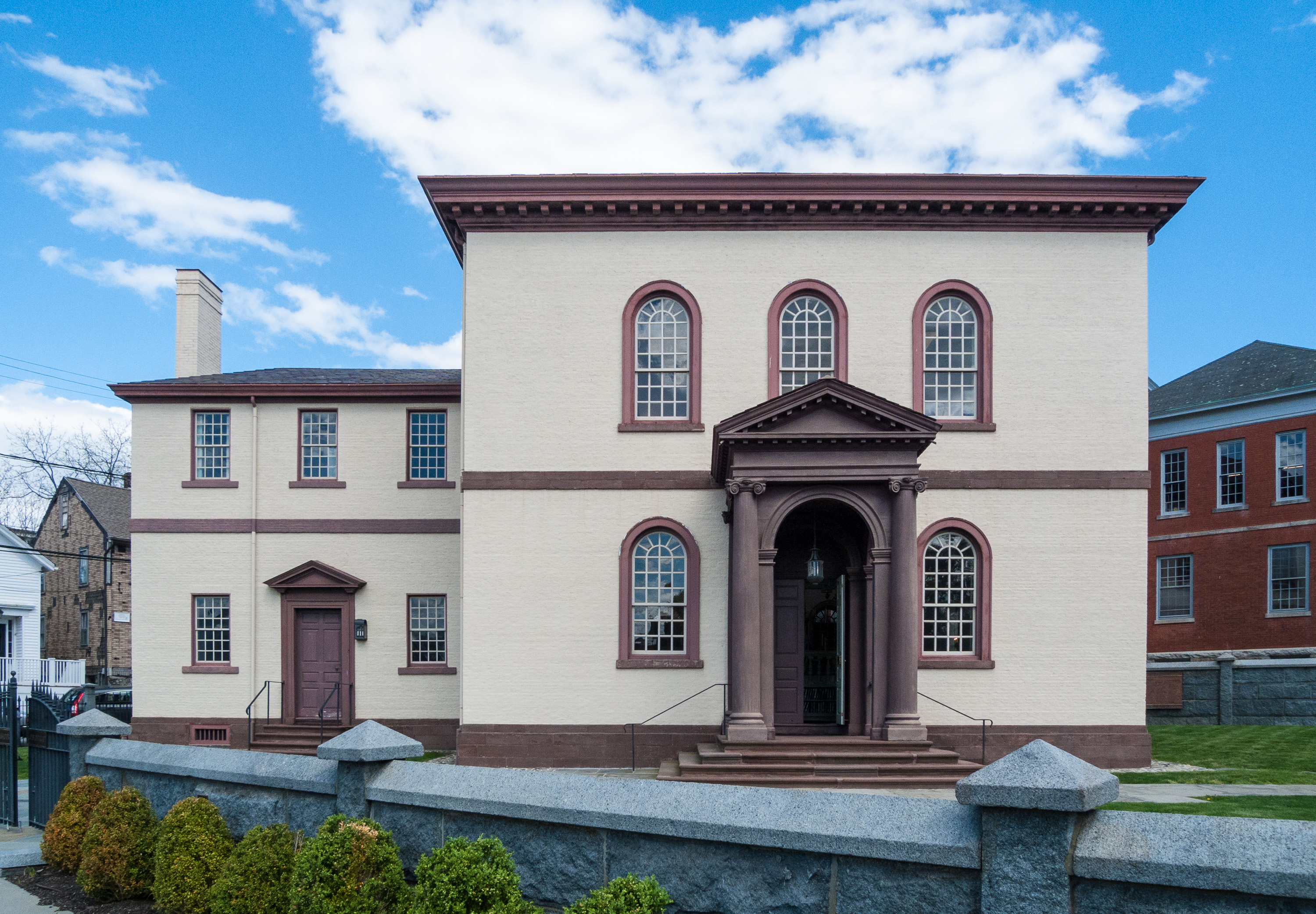
Touro Synagogue

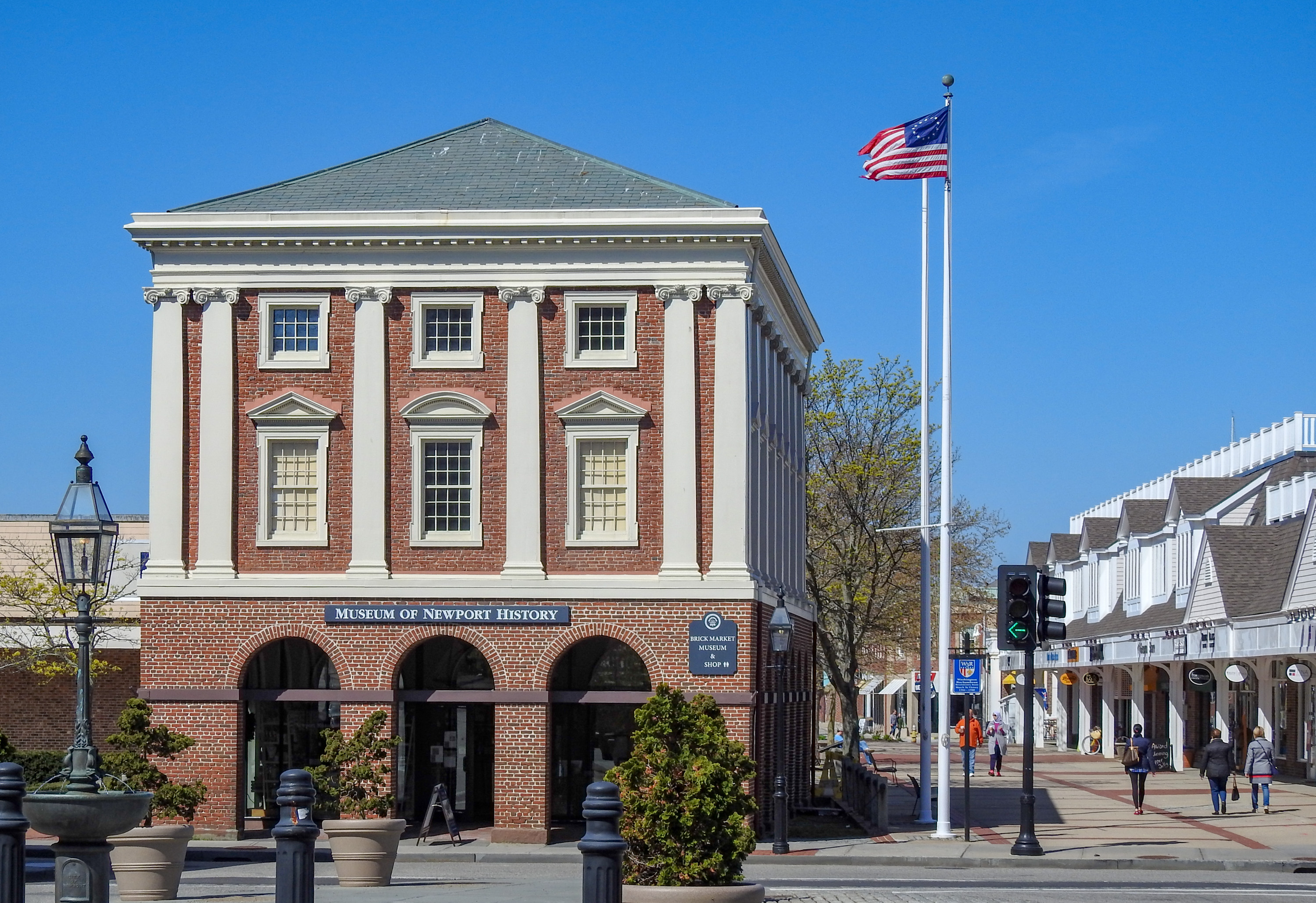
Old Brick Market

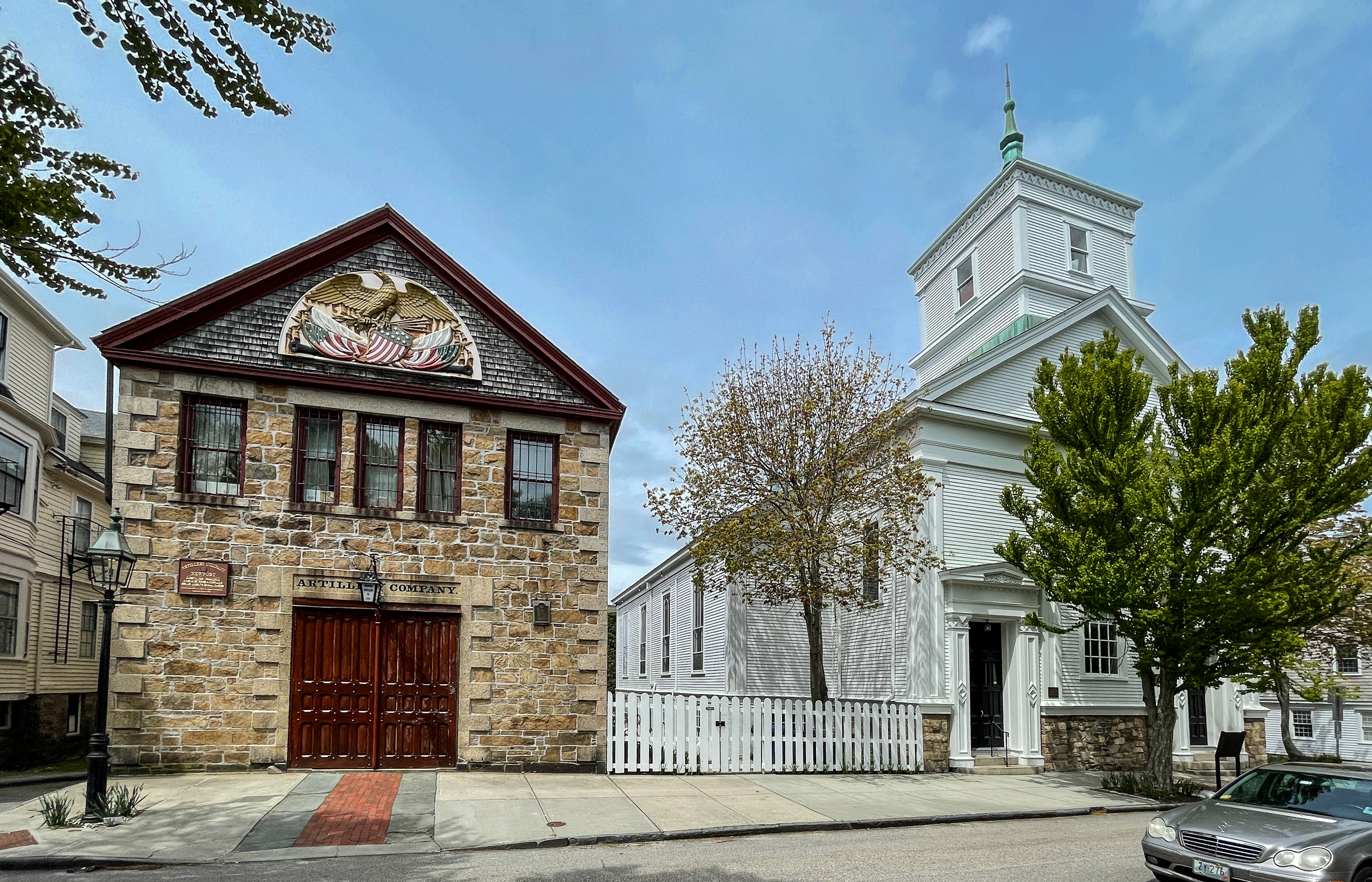
Newport Artillery Company and Clarke Street Meeting House

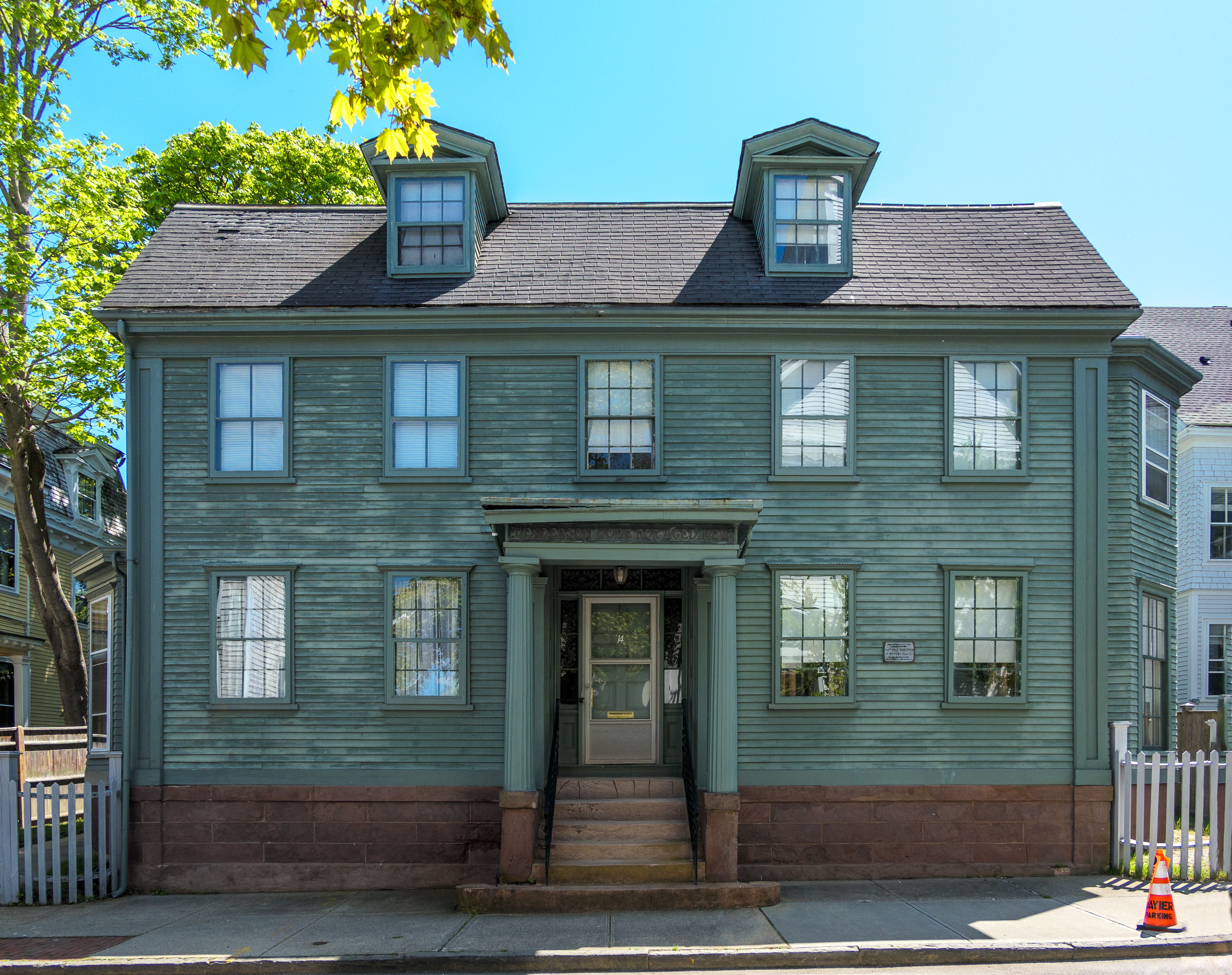
Ezra Stiles House, Clarke Street

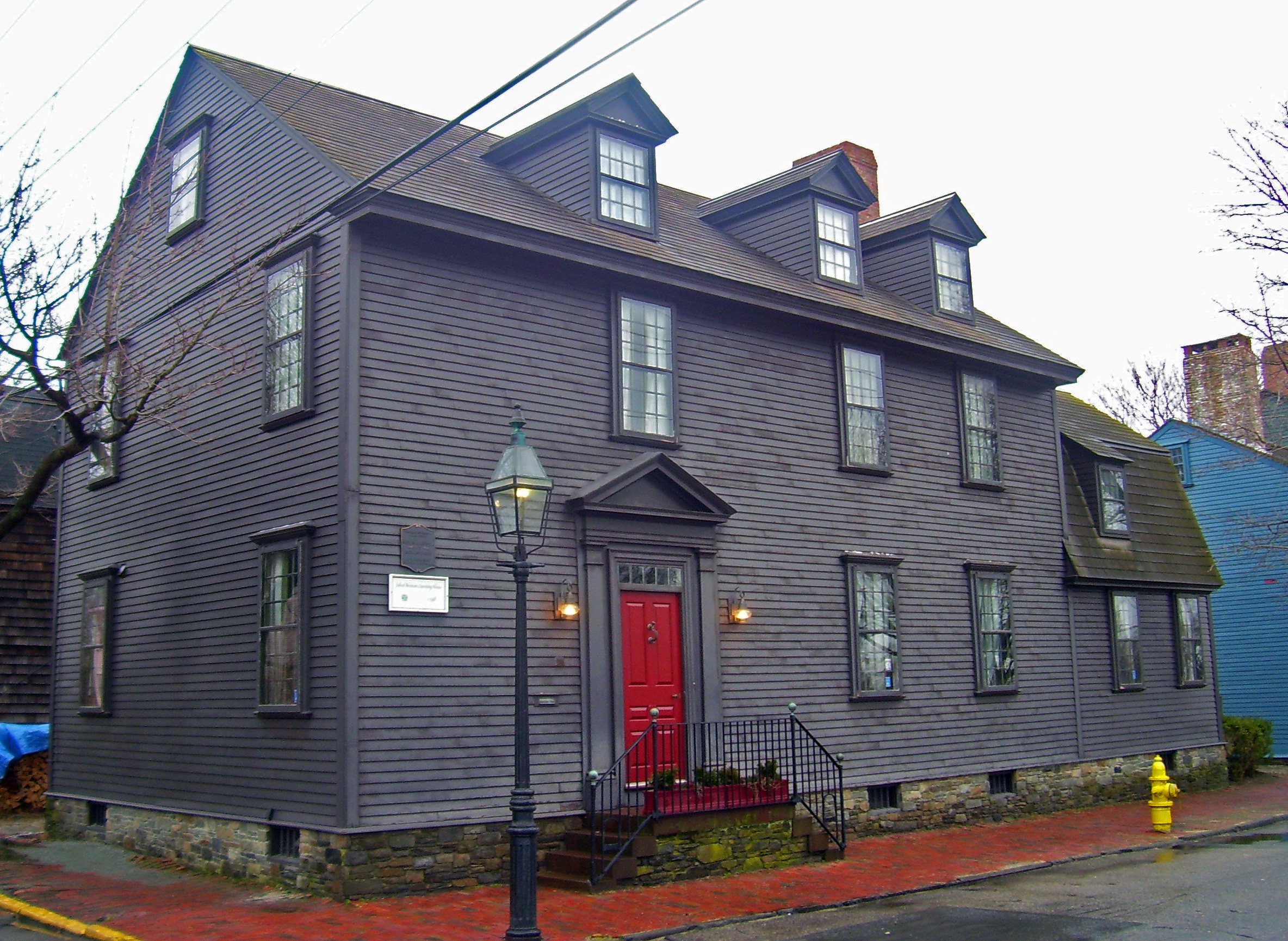
Quaker-style clapboard house in Easton's Point

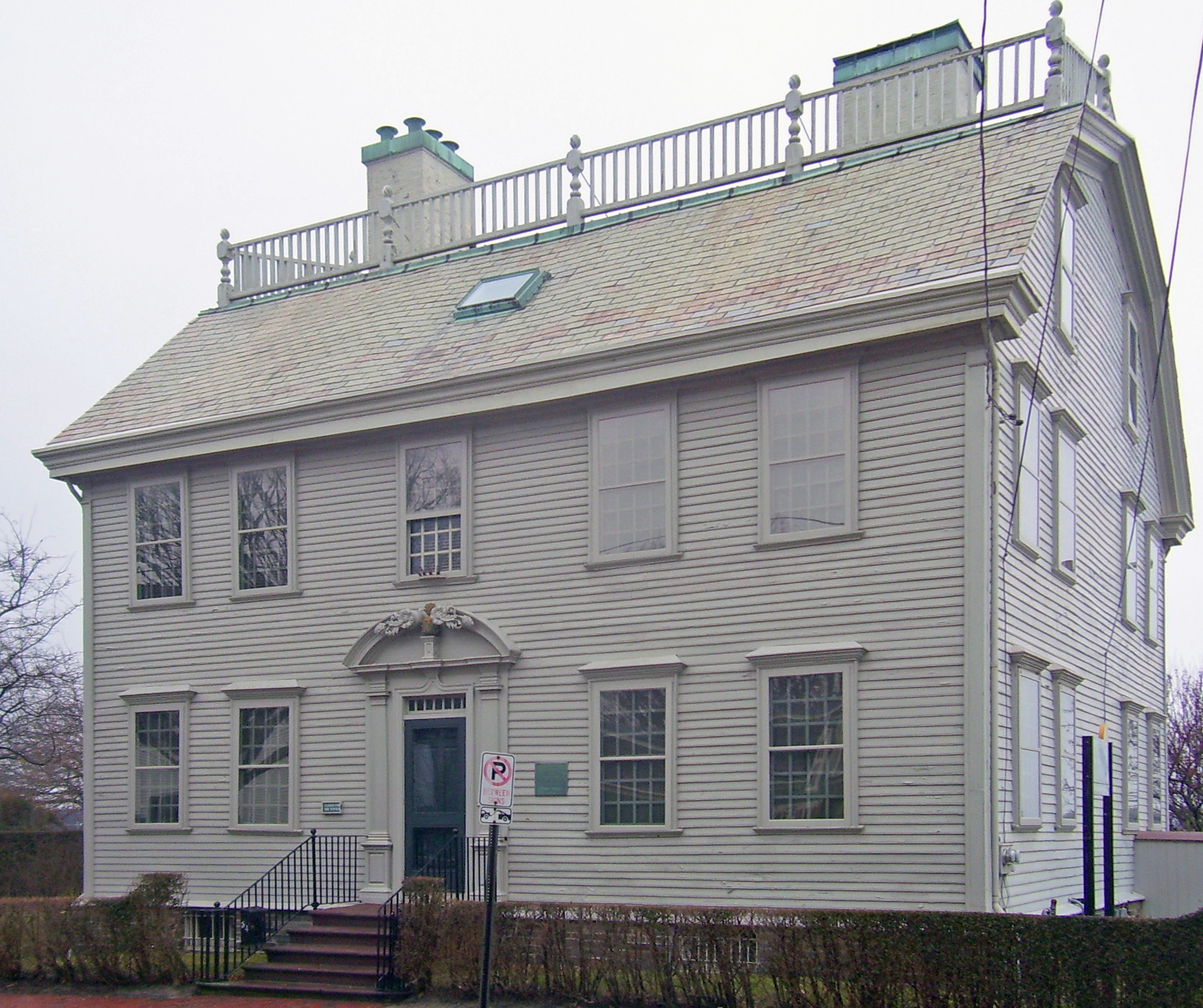
Hunter House

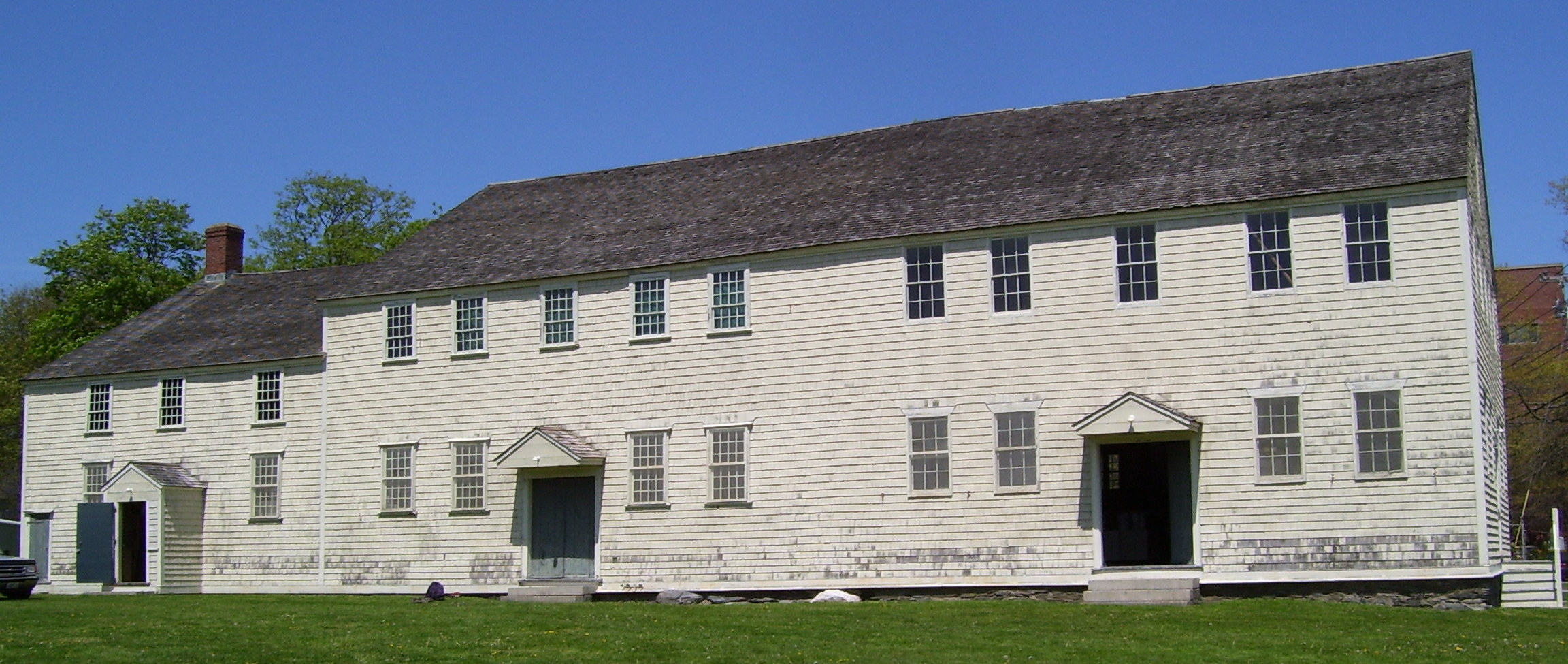
Great Friends Meeting House

=== Colonial era ===
The historic district is the core of the original city of Newport as it was during the years from its founding in 1639 to the American Revolution, when it served as the colonial capital. Surviving buildings date from the last years of the 17th century. The White Horse Tavern has stood on the same site since 1652, with the current building dating to 1673. The Wanton-Lyman-Hazard House, built by at least 1697, is the city's oldest house museum. Most of those early homes were simple clapboard structures in vernacular English styles that the colonists had adapted to the locally available materials.

Wood was also used to build Trinity Church, whose tall white spire is one of the city's most distinctive landmarks. In the early 1730s, efforts to bring some formal planning to Newport's development resulted in the construction of two major brick buildings showing heavy influence of the Georgian style then being popularized in London by Sir Christopher Wren. The Old Colony House and the Brick Market stand at opposite ends of Washington Square, then known as the Parade, and were meant to make it the kind of dignified public space found in English cities of the period.

Religious tolerance led to the immigration of Quakers from Massachusetts, where they were regarded as heretics, and communities of Sephardi Jews from Portugal. These left their mark with the Great Friends Meeting House on Marlborough Street, the oldest house of worship in Rhode Island, built in 1699, and Touro Synagogue, the oldest in the Western Hemisphere. The Quakers settled heavily in Easton's Point, building many of the wooden houses there and naming many of its streets after trees.

The city prospered as it became a more important port, and eventually sea captains who had made their fortunes began to settle down and build larger houses for themselves. One of these homes, Hunter House, another NHL located along the water in Easton's Point, is preserved today for its quality cabinetry, much of it originally manufactured in Newport.

=== 19th century ===
After independence the city lost some cachet when Providence, the wartime state capital, became the main capital. Still, the legislature continued to meet at the Colony House every other session, and held a ceremonial meeting there every April on 'Lection Day, when the results of the state's March elections were announced and the winners sworn in. It drew crowds from all over the state, and was Newport's major holiday for much of the 19th century.

Throughout most of that century, the downtown area remained a major, although somewhat neglected, port area, sustained by the nearby naval presence. Fleets were based in Newport, and the Naval War College is nearby, along with other naval facilities along the western shore of Aquidneck Island. Newer buildings in 19th-century styles, particularly Italianate, were erected along Thames, and many of these were home to businesses that catered to sailors on leave.

=== 20th century ===
In the years after the Civil War, the new rich of the Gilded Age began to rediscover Newport as a summer getaway, building larger and larger homes along and near Bellevue Avenue to the east. After the legislature moved to Providence full-time in 1900, depriving the city of some of its economy, the newer residents began to show an interest in preserving Newport's rich architectural past. They established the Newport Historical Society, and endowed some of their family fortunes towards architect Norman Isham's projects to restore the Wanton-Lyman-Hazard House, the Brick Market and Colony House during the 1920s and '30s. The fight to save the Hunter House from demolition led to the formation of another important local organization, the Preservation Society of Newport County.

Other local efforts concentrated on other houses later on, and they were eventually recognized with the NHL designations of the individual buildings in the early 1960s. The city created the district by ordinance in 1965, and it was recognized as an NHL itself in 1968.

The loss of the naval fleet in 1971 was a serious blow to the economy, and eventually the city controversially authorized the removal of many old factories, warehouses, and historic structures along the water, just west of the district boundary for the construction of retail facilities such as Brick Market Place and Long Wharf Mall, hotels, condominiums and America's Cup Avenue, a multilane through street whose name reflected the sloop races that then drew crowds to the city every few years.

In the mid-1980s, the America's Cup was finally lost to an Australian team, and left the city. The downtown area adapted by focusing on shopping opportunities for the tourists who were drawn to Newport to visit the many mansions every summer, and promoting its own historic buildings. The historic district retained enough of its character that Steven Spielberg came there in 1997 to film Amistad, deeming it a sufficient stand-in for 1840s New Haven, Connecticut, where the real case took place. The interiors of several historic buildings, especially Colony House, were used as sets for scenes in the film.

== Significant contributing properties ==
Many of the 392 buildings within the district are considered contributing properties to its historic character. These include five National Historic Landmarks and other buildings listed on the NRHP in their own right.

=== National Historic Landmarks ===
Unless otherwise noted, these are managed as museums by the Newport Historical Society.

- Brick Market, today the Museum of Newport History. Built in 1762 by self-taught architect Peter Harrison, it is located at the west end of Washington Square, along Thames Street. It demonstrates an advanced and sophisticated classicism throughout its Georgian design.
- Hunter House, on Washington Street in Easton's Point. A well-preserved Georgian frame house that contains much high-quality woodworking and furniture from Newport cabinetmakers of the period. Managed by the Preservation Society of Newport County.
- Old Colony House, at the east end of Washington Square where Broadway enters. The colonial and state legislatures met in this well-preserved Georgian public building, the fourth-oldest statehouse in the U.S.
- Trinity Church, between Elm, Church and Spring streets. Local architect Richard Munday designed this, the oldest parish church in the state, after Boston's Old North Church. It is still an active Episcopal congregation.
- Vernon House, on Clarke Street. Excellent, correctly proportioned Georgian frame house.
- Wanton-Lyman-Hazard House, on Broadway a short distance from the Colony House. Another Munday design, built by at least 1697, this is the oldest house in Newport. Its renovation reflects several different styles it passed through in the century after its construction.

=== Registered Historic Places ===
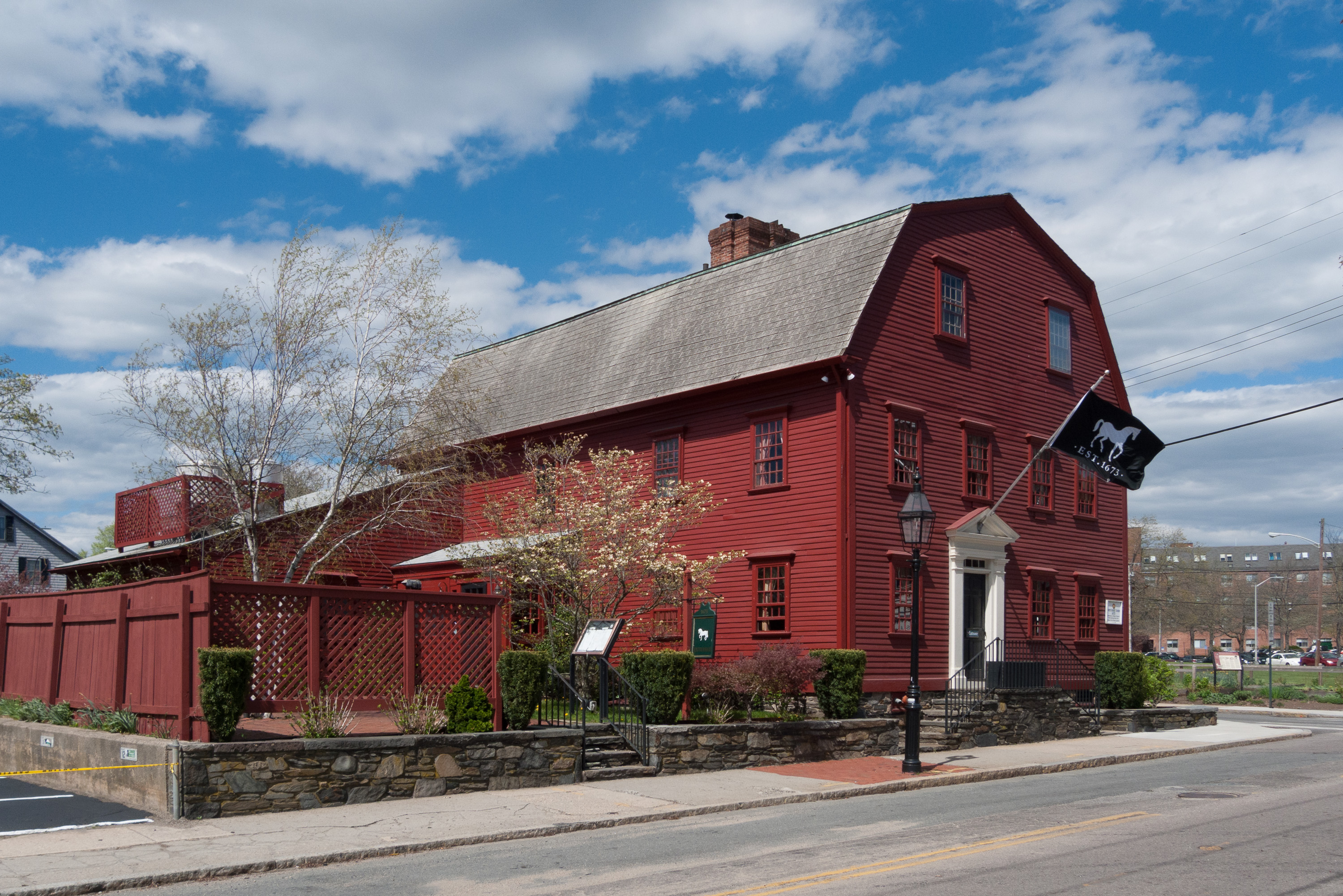
The White Horse Tavern

- Army and Navy YMCA Beaux Arts building on Washington Square was a popular destination for off-duty military personnel after its 1911 construction. Now serves as low-income housing.
- Great Friends Meeting House, on Marlborough Street. Built by Quakers in 1699, it is the oldest house of worship in the state.
- Touro Synagogue, on Touro Street. Another Peter Harrison design, dating from the 1720s. It is the oldest synagogue in the Western Hemisphere, built by the city's Portuguese Jewish population.
- White Horse Tavern On its current site on Marlborough Street since 1652, in its current building since 1687, making it the oldest drinking establishment in the U.S.

== Historic District Commission ==
To maintain the district's historic character, the city created its Historic District Commission (HDC) at the same time as the district itself. It consists of nine citizens appointed to three-year terms by the City Council to oversee not just the downtown historic district but Newport's other historic districts, two of which (Bellevue Avenue and Ocean Drive) are also recognized as National Historic Landmarks. The city considers them all one large district for its administrative purposes.

The HDC must review any exterior alterations to a building in the district beyond ordinary maintenance and repair, and issue a Certificate of Appropriateness. It cannot order any changes made to a property.

== See also ==
- List of National Historic Landmarks in Rhode Island
- National Register of Historic Places listings in Newport County, Rhode Island
- Southern Thames Historic District, south of this district
- Kay Street-Catherine Street-Old Beach Road Historic District, northeast of this district
