= Old Colony House =

Historic house in Rhode Island, United States

- U.S. National Register of Historic Places
- U.S. National Historic Landmark
- U.S. National Historic Landmark District – Contributing property
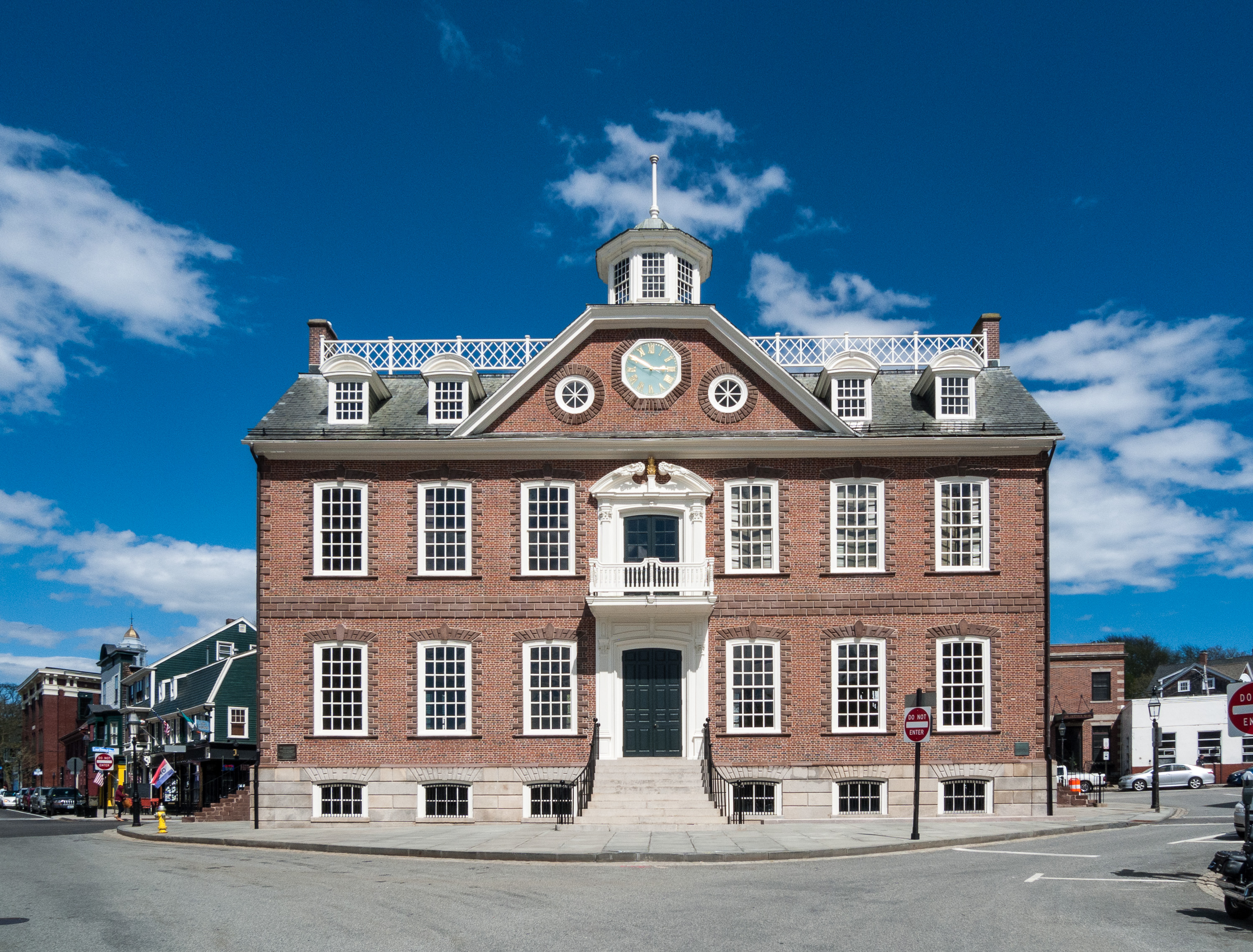
- Front elevation in 2017

- Location within Rhode Island Location within the United States
- Interactive map showing the location for Old Colony House
- Location: Washington Sq., Newport, Rhode Island
- Coordinates: 41°29′27″N 71°18′48″W
- Area: less than one acre
- Built: 1736-1739
- Architect: Richard Munday
- Architectural style: Colonial
- Part of: Newport Historic District (ID68000001)
- NRHP reference No.: 66000014

Significant dates
- Added to NRHP: October 15, 1966
- Designated NHL: October 9, 1960
- Designated NHLDCP: November 24, 1968

The Old Colony House, also known as Old State House or Newport Colony House, is located at the east end of Washington Square in the city of Newport, Rhode Island, United States. It is a brick Georgian-style building completed in 1741, and was the meeting place for the colonial legislature. From independence in 1776 to the early 20th century, the state legislature alternated its sessions between here and the Rhode Island State House in Providence.

The building has received little alteration since its construction. As one of the best-maintained surviving Georgian public buildings in the United States from the colonial era, it was designated a National Historic Landmark (NHL) in 1960. It is also a contributing property to the Newport Historic District, later designated an NHL itself. The building is still owned by the state, but managed as a museum by the Newport Historical Society.

Besides its political and architectural importance, the building was the site of many important Revolutionary events in Rhode Island. George Washington and Dwight Eisenhower have both been guests at the building. It has been used as a barracks, hospital, courthouse and a location for a Steven Spielberg film.

== Building ==
The two-and-a-half-story seven-bay front facade looks down the square to the similar Brick Market (now the Museum of Newport History), another NHL. The entryway is matched by a door and balcony immediately above it, capped by a trapezoidal gable with two round windows and a clock flanked by a pair of dormer windows on either side. Atop the roof is an octagonal cupola. It sits atop a raised basement.

== History ==
Previous to the construction of the Colony House, the site had been home to a small wooden courthouse built in 1687. The new building was among several projects undertaken as an attempt to apply formal planning to the development of Newport, which had previously lacked it. By putting the home of the colonial assembly at the top of the Parade (as Washington Square was then known), the town's leadership hoped to create a public space similar to that found in the English cities they or their parents had emigrated from.

Architect Richard Munday's design, one of his last, emulates Christopher Wren's buildings on the exterior but incorporates an interior layout similar to that of English town or guild halls. The first floor was thus an open space that could be used as a market, with civic offices upstairs.

=== Revolution ===
Many of the events leading up to and surrounding the Revolution in Rhode Island centered on the Colony House. In 1761, news of the death of King George II and his succession by his grandson George III was announced from the balcony. Three years later, the inaugural board meeting of the Corporation of the College in the English Colony of Rhode Island, which became Brown University, took place in the building. In 1765, Newport's citizens gathered around to celebrate the repeal of the Stamp Act, which led to riots that damaged the houses of three prominent supporters of the Act, including the nearby Wanton-Lyman-Hazard House, an NHL which is today the oldest house in the city.

Tensions between the colonies and Britain continued to grow, leading to the Gaspée Affair of 1772, in which a ship of the Royal Navy was burned off present-day Warwick by colonists resisting the enforcement of the Navigation Acts. The Royal Commission of Inquiry into the incident was convened at Colony House the following year. Although it could have sent any suspects to London to face trial before an Admiralty court, a provision which greatly concerned most colonists, it found insufficient evidence to prosecute anyone.

The incident further galvanized colonial opposition to British rule. The colony's General Assembly began preparing for war, and ordered that weapons be stored in Colony House in 1774. Two years later, the Declaration of Independence was read from the front steps. The British occupied Newport, then the colonial capital, later that year. During that time the building was used as a barracks. When the French joined the war later and drove the British out of the city, they used the building as a hospital. It is widely believed that a French Army chaplain celebrated Rhode Island's first Roman Catholic Mass at Colony House during this period, but no evidence has been found of this. After the surrender at Yorktown, in 1782, Rochambeau held a banquet in the building's first-floor Great Hall to honor George Washington. A portrait of Washington, painted by Rhode Island native Gilbert Stuart, hangs in the first floor. In 1786 Trevett v. Weeden one of the earliest cases of judicial review was decided in the building by the Rhode Island Supreme Court. James Mitchell Varnum successfully represented the defendant in the cause.

=== 1842 Constitutional convention ===
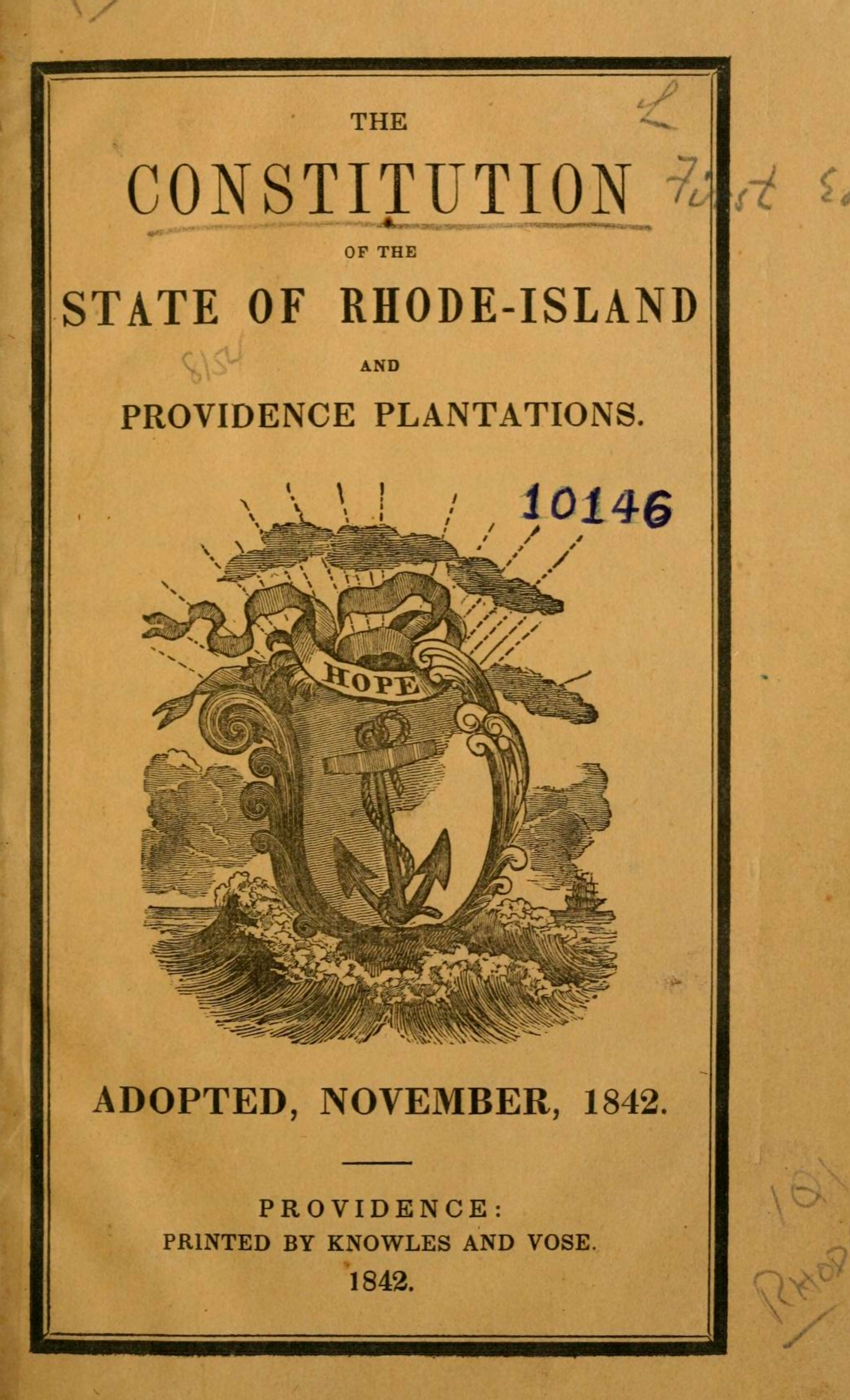
The 1842 Constitution

In September 1842, delegates met at Colony House to draft a new constitution to replace the 1663 Royal Charter. The convention, held as a response to the Dorr Rebellion, debated questions of expansion of citizenship and suffrage. Prior to 1842, the vote was held only by a small minority of rural elite landowners.

By November 1842, a new Constitution was put before the voters of the state. The new Constitution, which passed 7024 to 51, expanded the vote to include African-Americans, becoming the first state to do so. But it also contained a $134 suffrage qualification to block the vote from naturalized citizens.

=== 19th century ===
The occupation of Newport had forced the colonists to establish their capital at Providence, and it remained there after independence. But the state legislature continued to meet in Newport every other year, and one day each May known as 'Lection Day. After the ceremonial meeting, results of the state's April elections would be announced, and the winners inaugurated on the spot. It was Newport's most important holiday for many years.

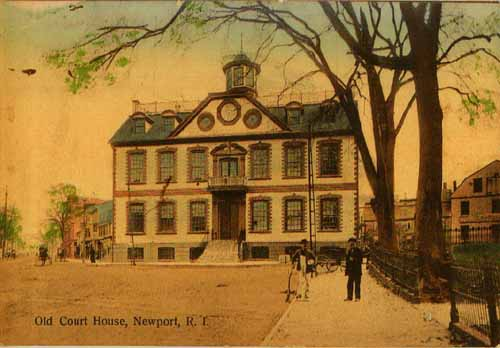
Colony House from an early 20th-century postcard

In 1900, with Rhode Island's current capitol building mostly complete, the legislature ended its tradition of alternating sessions between the state's two largest cities. It subsequently became the Newport County courthouse.

=== 20th century ===
It continued to serve as the courthouse until 1926. Afterwards, it and the other two future NHLs nearby were the first three historic nearby buildings renovated by Norman Isham at the behest of the Newport Historical Society. That work was completed in 1932.

In 1957, the building received its first sitting American president, Dwight D. Eisenhower. In a short speech from the steps, he began a two-day visit to the city and its historic sites by praising the city's hospitality and expressing regret that his wife, who had accompanied him from Washington, could not join him at the building. "It is her great ambition to visit so many of these places," he said, "particularly those where the heroes of the Revolutionary times spent so much of their time."

His administration its last year designated the building one of the first National Historic Landmarks in 1960. Six years after that, it was duly listed on the inaugural National Register of Historic Places. Newport's well-preserved historic character drew Steven Spielberg to the city in 1997, where it stood in for mid-19th century New Haven, Connecticut, during principal photography for Amistad. Colony House's exterior can be seen in the background in a few scenes, and the courtroom scenes were filmed inside. Rhode Island Senate majority leader M. Teresa Paiva-Weed, who represents the area, got the Senate to pass a resolution calling for the legislature to again meet in Newport on the centenary of their last meeting there in 1900.

The Newport Historical Society manages the building for the state, which still owns it. It is open as a museum for tours during the summer months. It is also available for event rentals.

== See also ==
- List of National Historic Landmarks in Rhode Island
- National Register of Historic Places listings in Newport County, Rhode Island

== Gallery ==
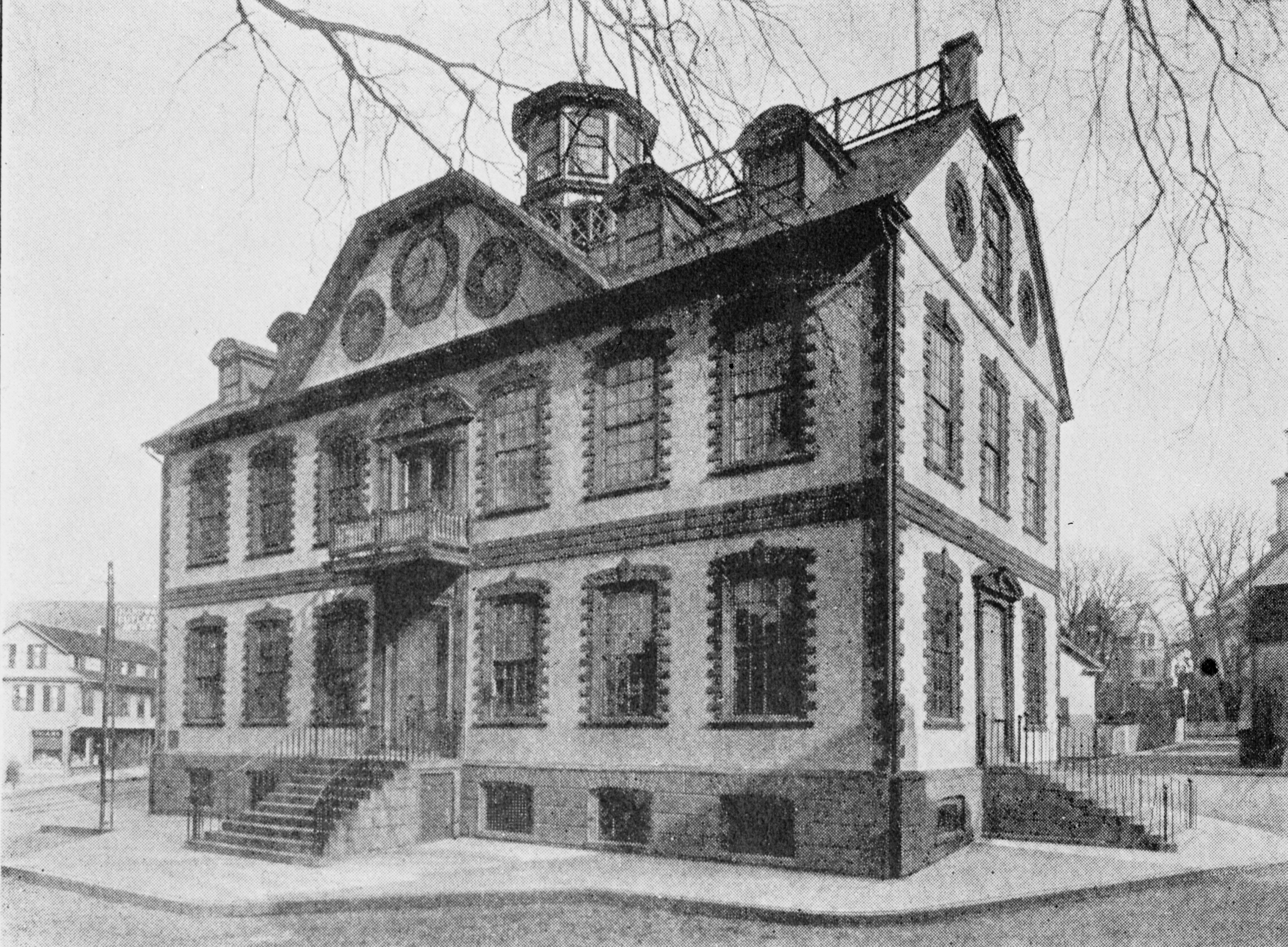
Old Colony House before 1917

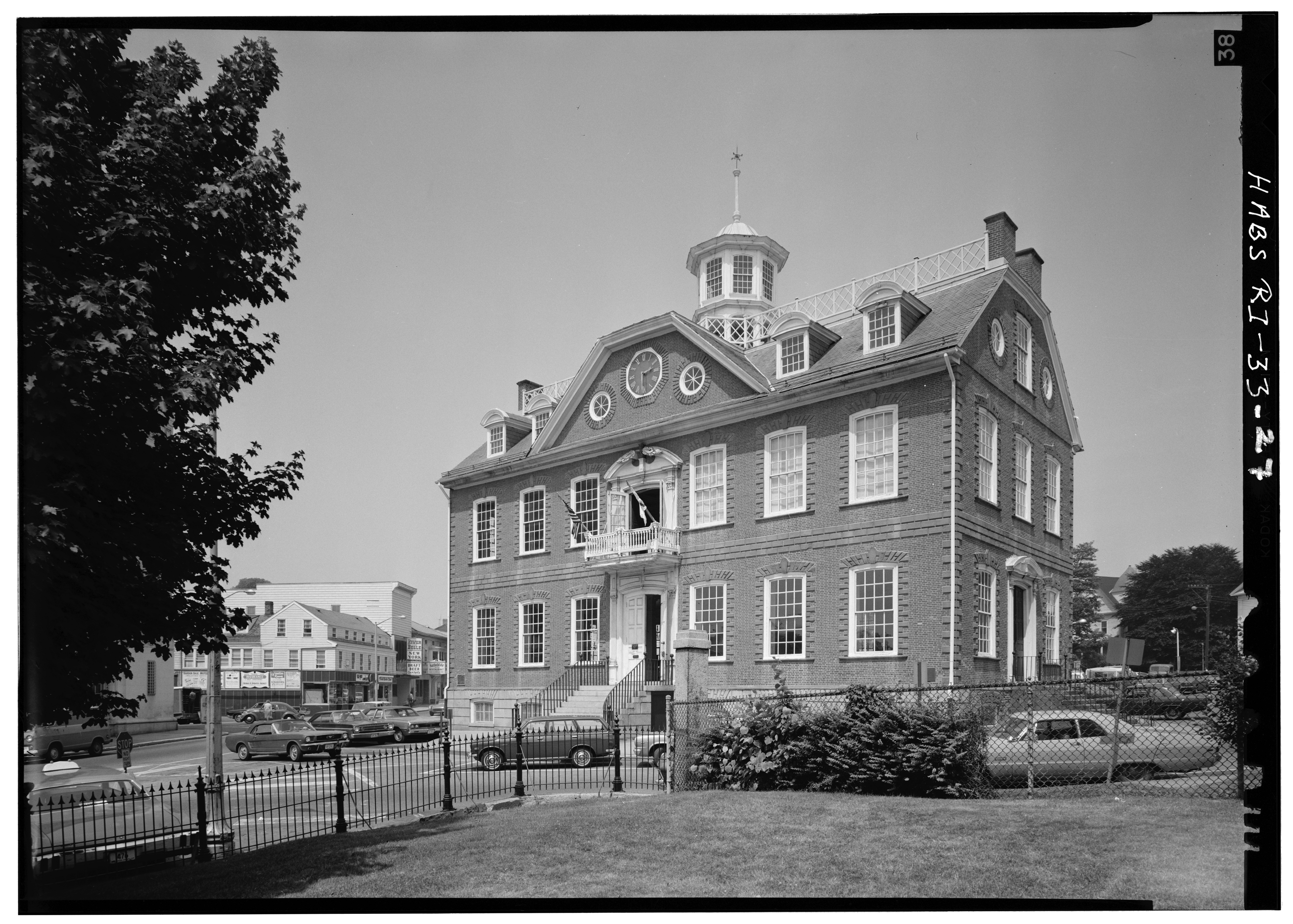
West Front

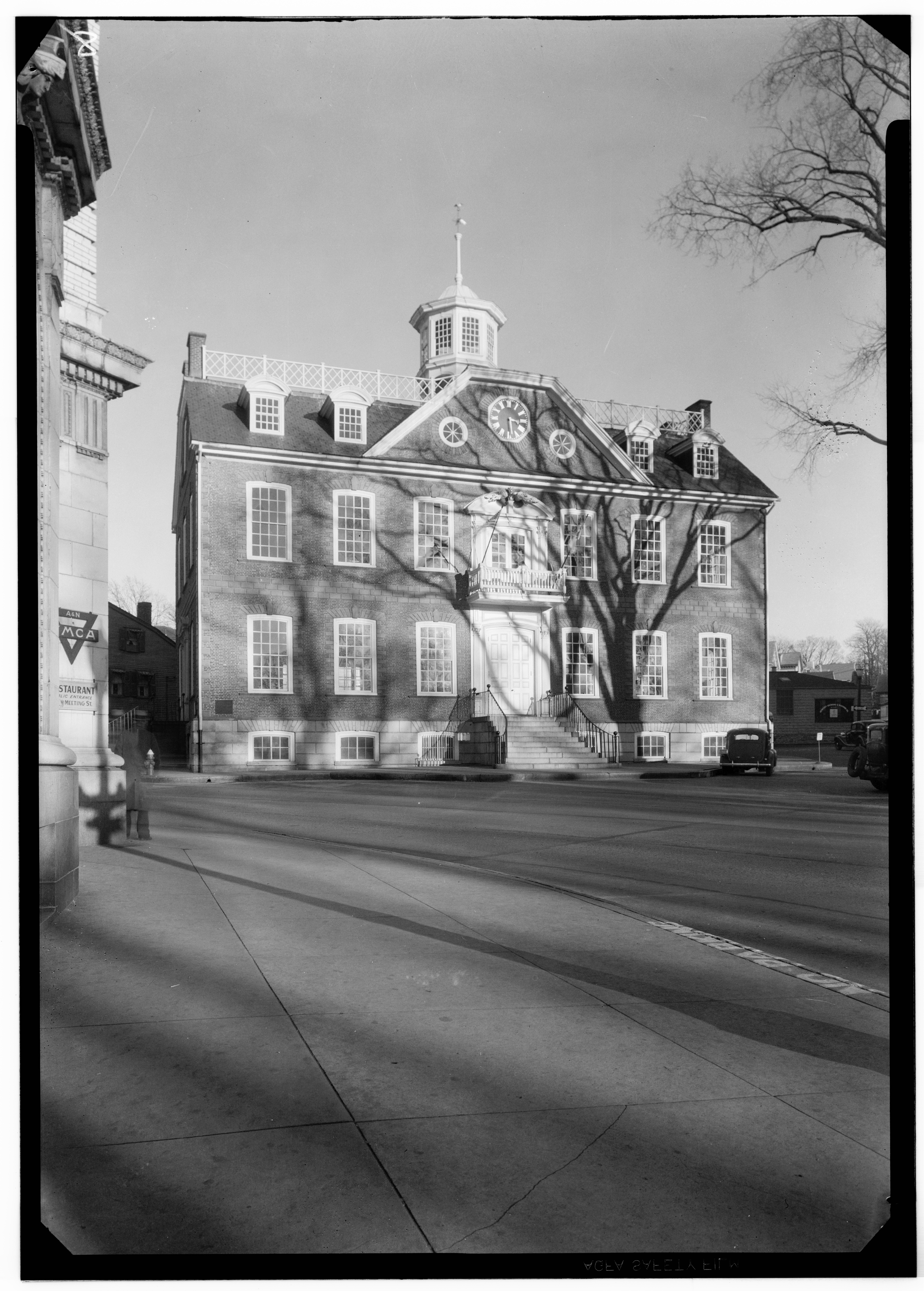
Front Elevation in 1937

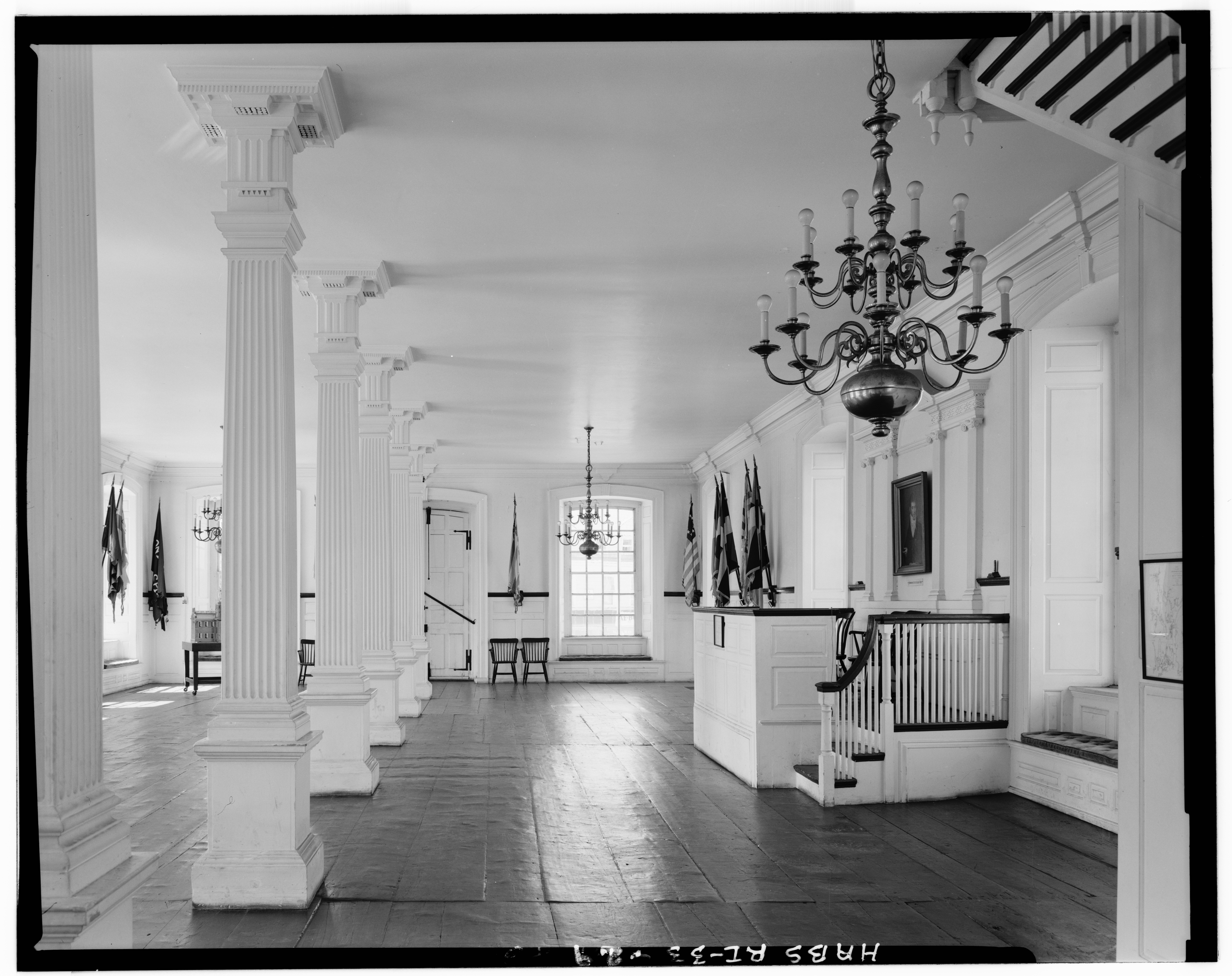
First Floor

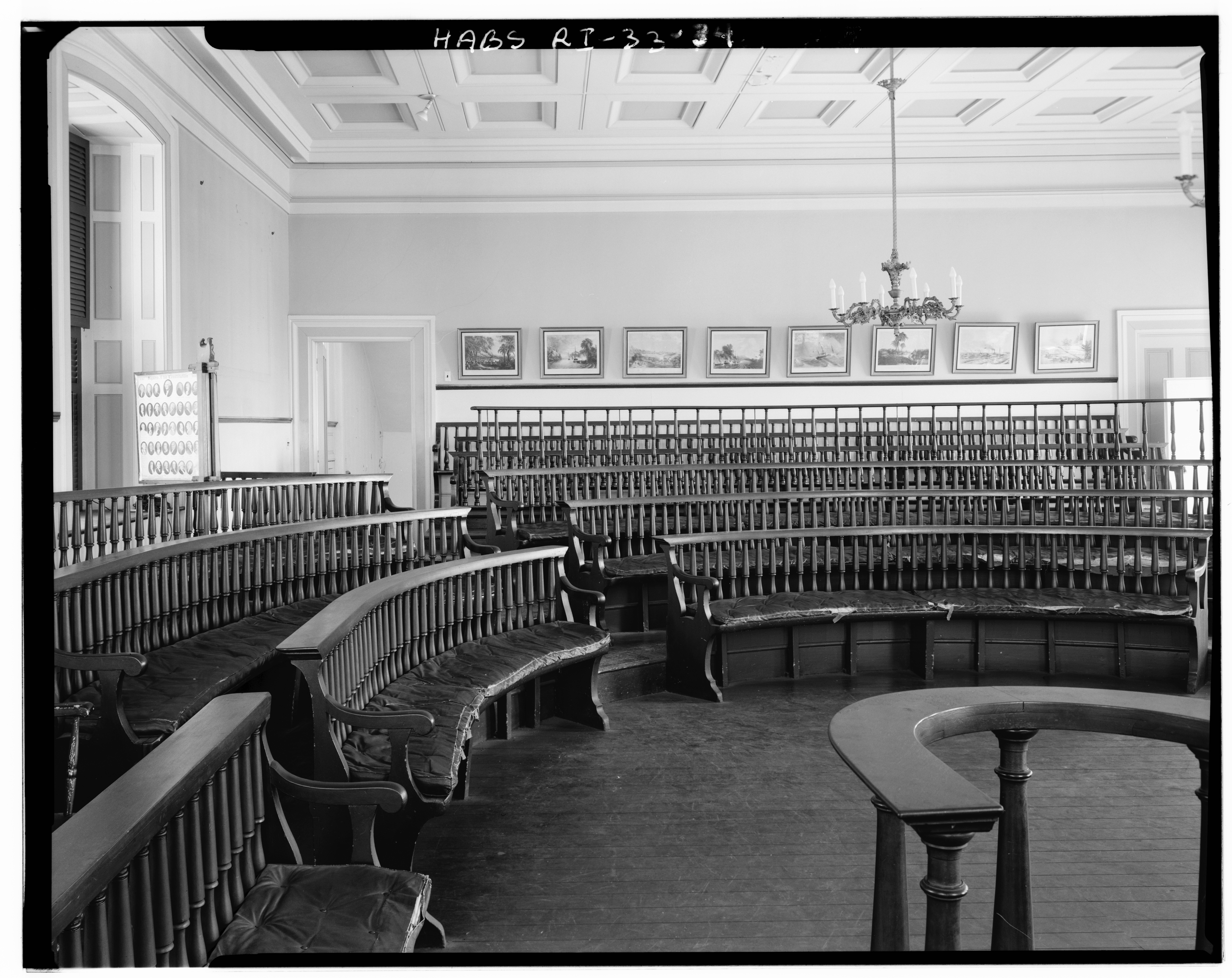
Courtroom
