= Trevett v. Weeden =

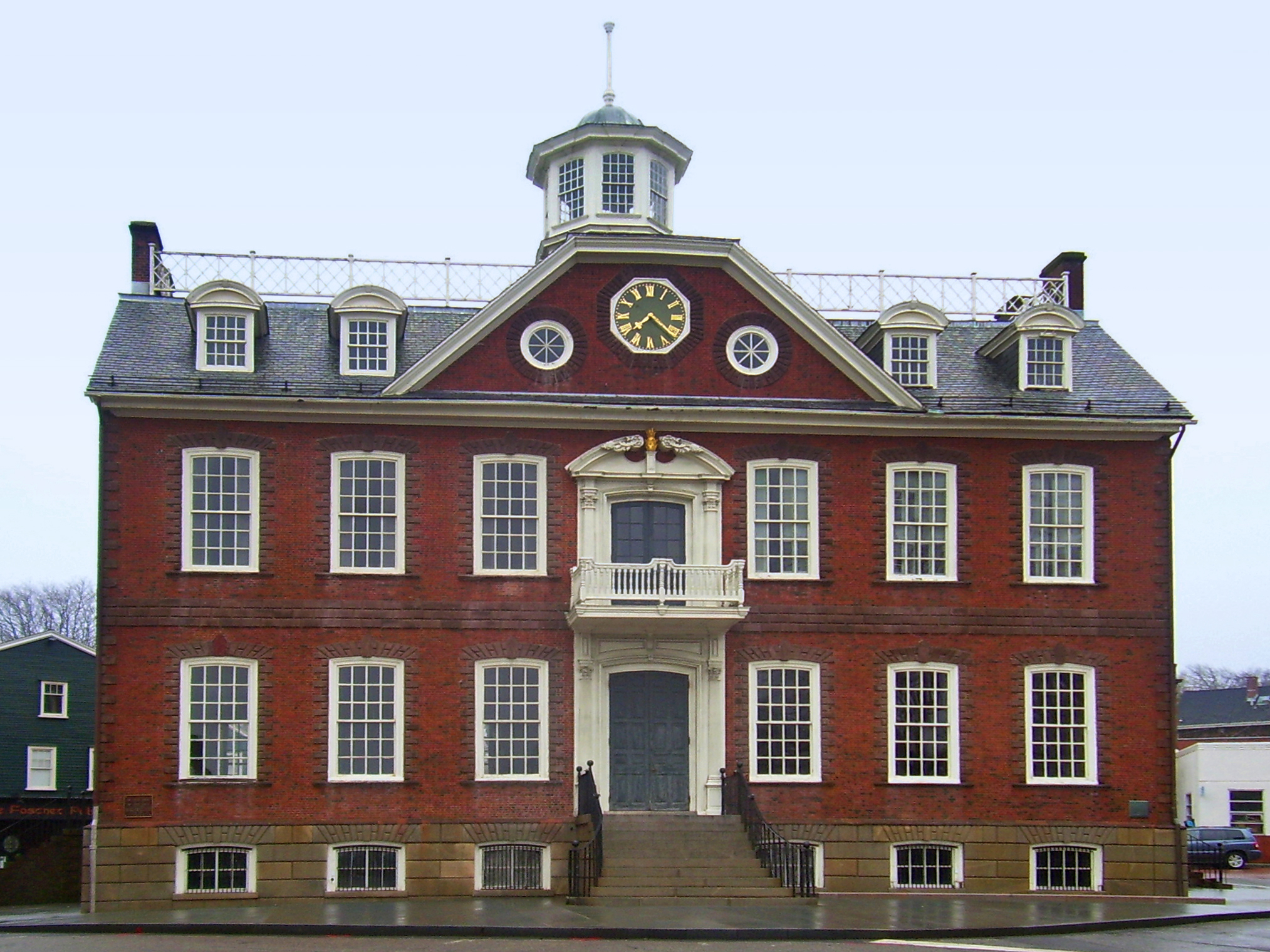
18th century Newport Colony House, site of the trial

Trevett v. Weeden (1786) was a Rhode Island Supreme Court decision finding state legislation regarding paper currency was violative of the state constitution. The decision set precedent for Marbury v. Madison regarding judicial review.

== History ==
On September 25–26, 1786, the Superior Court of Judicature of Rhode Island (Rhode Island Supreme Court) heard the case in Newport, Rhode Island with a decision by David Howell. In May 1786, the Rhode Island General Assembly passed legislation allowing paper money as legal tender, and in June 1786 the Court created penalties for anyone refusing to accept such currency. In August 1786, the Assembly passed further legislation providing that trial of offenders should take place "without any jury," by a majority of the judges and no appeal was allowed. Both common law and the Constitution of Rhode Island guaranteed a jury trial in contrast to the legislation.

General James M. Varnum, a U.S. Congressman representing the defendant argued that although the American Revolution occurred, the original colonial Constitution was still valid and the assembly derived its powers from this document. Accordingly, the Court retained the power to judge the constitutionality of any legislation under the Constitution. The Court found that the paper currency law was unconstitutional ("not cognizable") because it limited the right to a jury trial for violators.

== Aftermath ==
After the decision, the justices were brought before the General Assembly, reprimanded, and all but one were not reappointed for the following term. The Assembly then appointed paper currency advocates such as William West to the Court. The case was later cited as precedent for judicial review in Marbury v. Madison.
