= Daniel Fones =

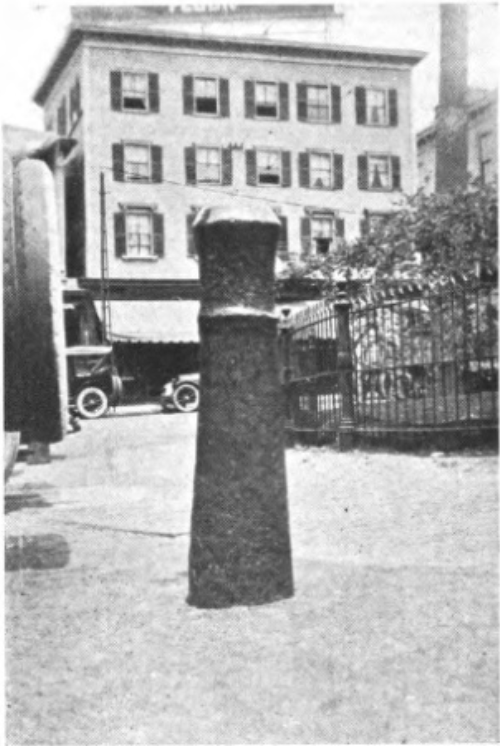
Cannon of Tartar, Washington Square (Newport, Rhode Island) (c. 1922)

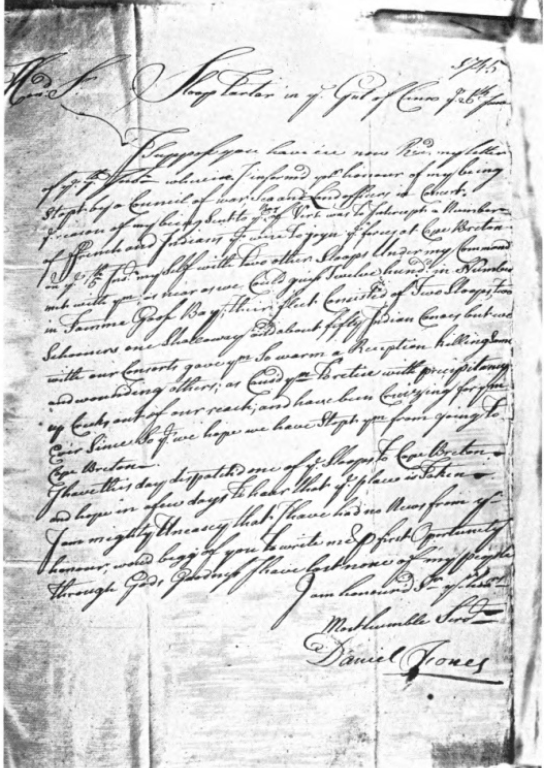
Daniel Fones Letter, Battle off Tatamagouche, 1745

Daniel Fones (born 9 March 1713, Conanicut Island, Jamestown, Rhode Island – c. 1790, North Kingstown, Washington, Rhode Island) was the leading military commander for Rhode Island in the Siege of Louisbourg in 1745. He was the captain of Tartar, the privateer vessel was the Rhode Island contribution to the victory at Louisbourg (the 150 soldiers from Rhode Island arrived after the Siege).

Fones took command of Tartar at the outbreak of King George's War. In April 1745, Fones successfully escorted the 500 soldiers in seven transports to Canso, Nova Scotia. During the voyage he drew fire from the French 32-gun frigate Renommée, under Kersaint-Coëtnempren, in an eight-hour engagement. In May 1745, participating in the blockade of Louisbourg, Fones captured the French merchant ship Deux Amies. In June he participated in the Naval battle off Tatamagouche. In the battle, Fones rescued the Connecticut warship Resolution and crushed the French and Indian expedition en route to save Louisbourg.

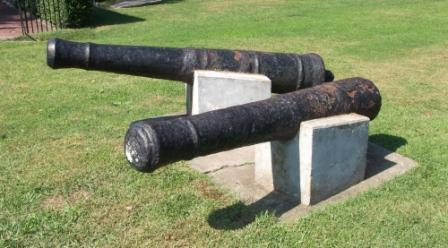
Cannon from Captain Fones' ship Tartar, Newport Historical Society

After the war he commanded the privateer Prince Frederick, the Defiance and Success.

After he retired from the sea, he represented North Kingstown in the General Assembly. Then in 1770, he opened David Fones Tavern at 126 Main St., North Kingstown. His father Jeremiah Fones was buried at Chestnut Hill Cemetery, Exeter, Washington County, Rhode Island.
