= David Donahew =

British officer

David Donahew (? - 29 June 1745) was a British officer who fought in the Raid on Canso and Naval battle off Tatamagouche during King George's War.

In this same month as the Raid on Canso, Captain David Donahue of the Resolution (Resolute) took prisoner the chief of the Mi'kmaq people of Ile Royale Jacques Pandanuques with his family to Boston and killed him. Donahue also took 8 Mi'kmaw prisoners from Canso on 14 April.

Weeks after the Siege of Louisbourg (1745), Donahew and Fones again engaged Marin, who was now nearing the Strait of Canso. Donahew and 11 of his men put ashore and were immediately surrounded by 300 Indians. The captain and five of his men were slain and the remaining six were taken prisoner. The Indians were said to have cut open Donahew's chest, sucked his blood, then eaten parts of him and his five companions. This tale significantly heightened the sense of gloom and frustration settling over the fortress. On 19 July the 12-gun provincial cruiser of Donavan's the Resolution sailed slowly into the harbour with her colours flying at half-mast. The horrifying tale of the fate of her captain, David Donahew, and five crew members spread rapidly through the fortress.
