= Naval battle off Tatamagouche =

1745 naval battle

Coordinates: 45°43′N 63°17′W

Naval Battle off Tatamagouche
- Part of King George's War
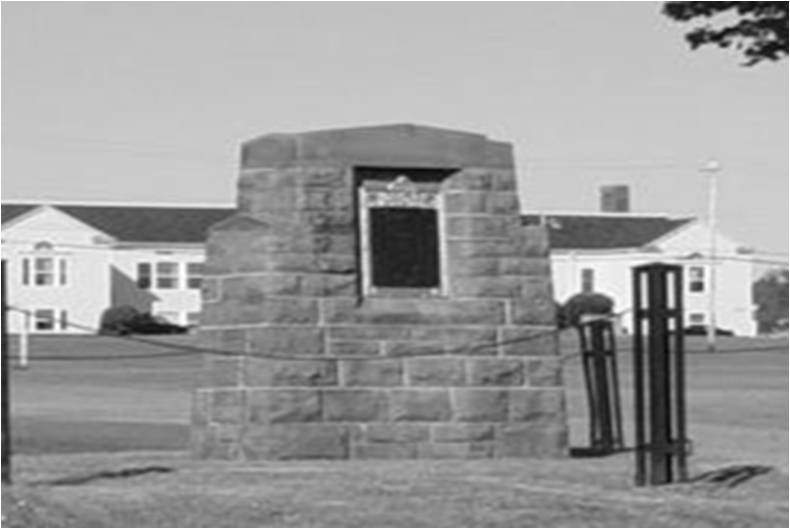
- Naval Battle off Tatamagouche - National Historic Sites of Canada Plaque
Date	15 June 1745 (old style)
Location	Tatamagouche, Nova Scotia
Result	British victory

Belligerents
France; Wabanaki Confederacy; (Mi'kmaq militia and Maliseet); Huron	Great Britain

Commanders and leaders
Paul Marin de la Malgue	Captain David Donahew; Captain Daniel Fones; Captain Robert Beckwith (Becket)

Strength
500 French; 700 natives from Wabanaki Confederacy (Mi'kmaq and Maliseet) and Huron; 2 schooners; 2 sloops; 50 canoes (each with 14 natives)	Over 175 men four ships

Casualties and losses
"Considerable slaughter" of French and Indians; "many slain"	None

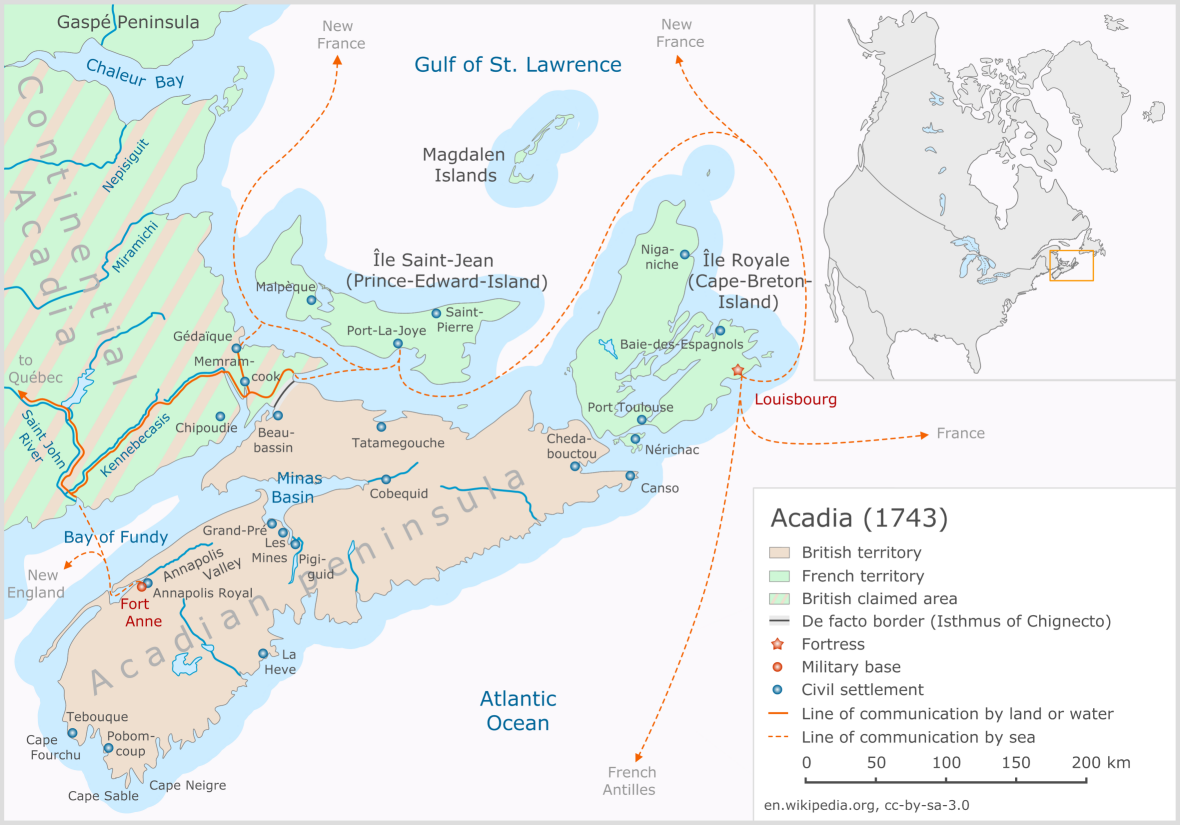
Acadia in the year 1743, with Tatamagouche at the north coast of the Acadian peninsula

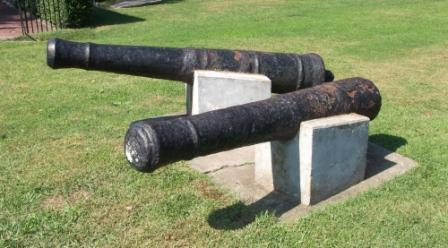
Cannon from Captain Fones' ship Tartar, Newport Historical Society

The action of 15 June 1745 (also known as the Battle of Famme Goose Bay) was a naval encounter between three New England vessels and a French and native relief convoy en route to relieve the Siege of Louisbourg (1745) during King George's War. The French and native convoy of four French vessels and fifty native canoes carrying 1200 fighters was led by Paul Marin de la Malgue and the New England forces were led by Captain David Donahew. The New Englanders were successful. The Governor of Ile Royal Louis Du Pont Duchambon thought that the New Englanders would have ended their siege of Louisbourg had Marin arrived. (There were 1800 French soldiers at Louisbourg versus 4200 New Englanders.) Instead, the day following the battle, Duchambon surrendered Louisbourg to New England.

== Background ==
At the outbreak of the war, in May 1744, Captain David Donahue of the Resolution took prisoner the chief of the Mi'kmaq people of Ile Royale Jacques Pandanuques with his family to Boston.

In May 1745, Paul Marin de la Malgue led 200 troops and hundreds of Mi'kmaq joined a siege against Annapolis Royal. The siege was ended after three weeks when Marin was recalled to assist with defending the French during the Siege of Louisbourg.

During the Siege at Annapolis, the Wabanaki Confederacy (Mi'kmaq and Maliseet) took prisoner William Pote and some of Gorham's Rangers. During his captivity, Pote wrote one of the most important captivity narratives from Acadia and Nova Scotia. While at Cobequid, Pote reported that an Acadian said that the French soldiers should have "left their [the English] carcasses behind and brought their skins." He also wrote about the Naval battle off Tatamagouch.

== Battle ==
Captain Donahew in Resolution (12 guns, 50 crew) was travelling with Captain Daniel Fones in Tartar (14 guns, 100 crew); and Captain Robert Becket in Bonetta (six guns). The two latter ships left Resolution to pursue smoke from what they believed to be a French and native encampment. Shortly after they left, four French vessels appeared, led by Marin. Upon seeing the native canoes, Captain Donahew hoisted a French flag on his own sloop so the natives would think it was a French privateer with a prize. The wind dropped off and the Resolution was becalmed and surrounded by the French vessels and canoes. At 10:00 am on 15 June 1745, Donahew raised the British flag on his ship and a fierce two-hour battle ensued. Donahew reported firing at the four vessels two hundred rounds from his four pounders; fifty-three rounds from his three pounders, and "my swivel and small Arms continually playing on them." The New Englanders reported there was a "considerable slaughter" of the French and natives.

The four French vessels were about to board Donahew's vessel when relief arrived, Captain Fones and Captain Becket returned. As a result, the French retreated to Gouzar. The two other French vessels went up near-by Dewar's River. The natives remained behind a seawall.

The convoy eventually retreated to Tatamagouche. They built defenses on land, anticipating an attack by the New Englanders. Another New England vessel appeared. A week after the initial attack, presumably because of the number of their losses, the Huron decided to abandon the convoy and return to Quebec.

== Aftermath ==
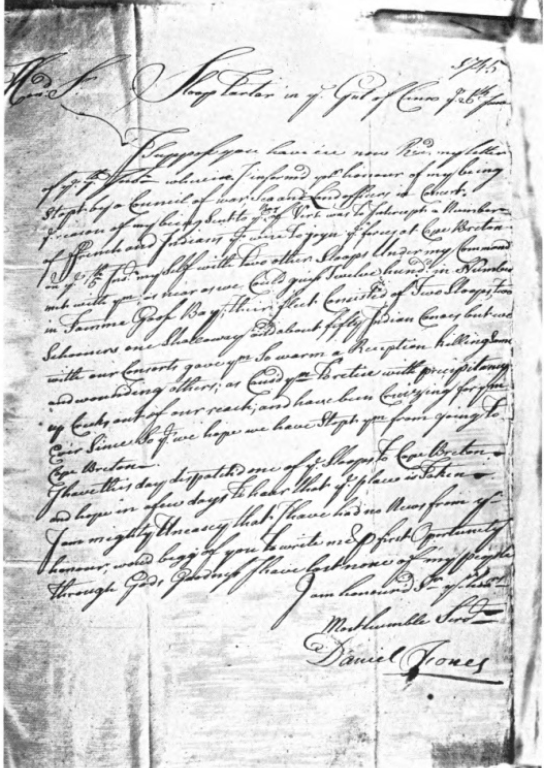
Daniel Fones Letter, Battle off Tatamagouche, 1745

The battle was significant in the downfall of Louisbourg because Marin's relief envoy was thwarted. Without the relief of the convoy, the following day Louisbourg fell.

Weeks after the fall of Louisbourg, Donahew and Fones again engaged Marin, who was now nearing the Strait of Canso. Donahew and 11 of his men put ashore and were immediately surrounded by 300 Indians. The captain and five of his men were slain and the remaining six were taken prisoner. The Indians were said to have cut open Donahew's chest, sucked his blood, then eaten parts of him and his five companions. This tale significantly heightened the sense of gloom and frustration settling over the fortress. On July 19, the 12-gun provincial cruiser of Donavan's, Resolution, sailed slowly into the harbour with her colours flying at half-mast. The horrifying tale of the fate of her captain, David Donahew, and five crew members spread rapidly through the fortress.

== Legacy ==
In commemoration of this battle, the Historic Sites Monument Board, in August 1939, erected at Tatamagouche a monument in a spot overlooking the waters of the harbour. (See Battle of Tatamagouche Monument.)

Captain Fones brought Tartar (14 guns) back safe to her home port in Rhode Island. Two cannon from Tartar are on the lawn of the Newport Historical Society (See Tartar's Guns), which were formerly mounted close to the Oliver Perry Monument at Washington Square, Newport, Rhode Island

== See also ==
- Military history of Nova Scotia
