= Newport Historical Society =

Non-profit organization

Coordinates: 41.489295°N 71.311749°W

- Founded: 1854
- Type: non-profit
- Purpose: Collect, document and preserve Newport’s unique contribution to our national narrative over the course of five centuries.
- Headquarters: Newport, Rhode Island
- Website: newporthistory.org

The Newport Historical Society is a historical society in Newport, Rhode Island that was chartered in 1854 to collect and preserve books, manuscripts, and objects pertaining to Newport's history.

== History of the society ==
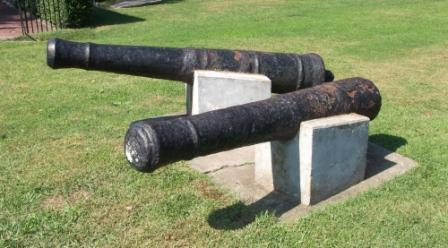
Naval battle off Tatamagouche - Cannons from Captain Daniel Fones' ship Tartar, Newport Historical Society

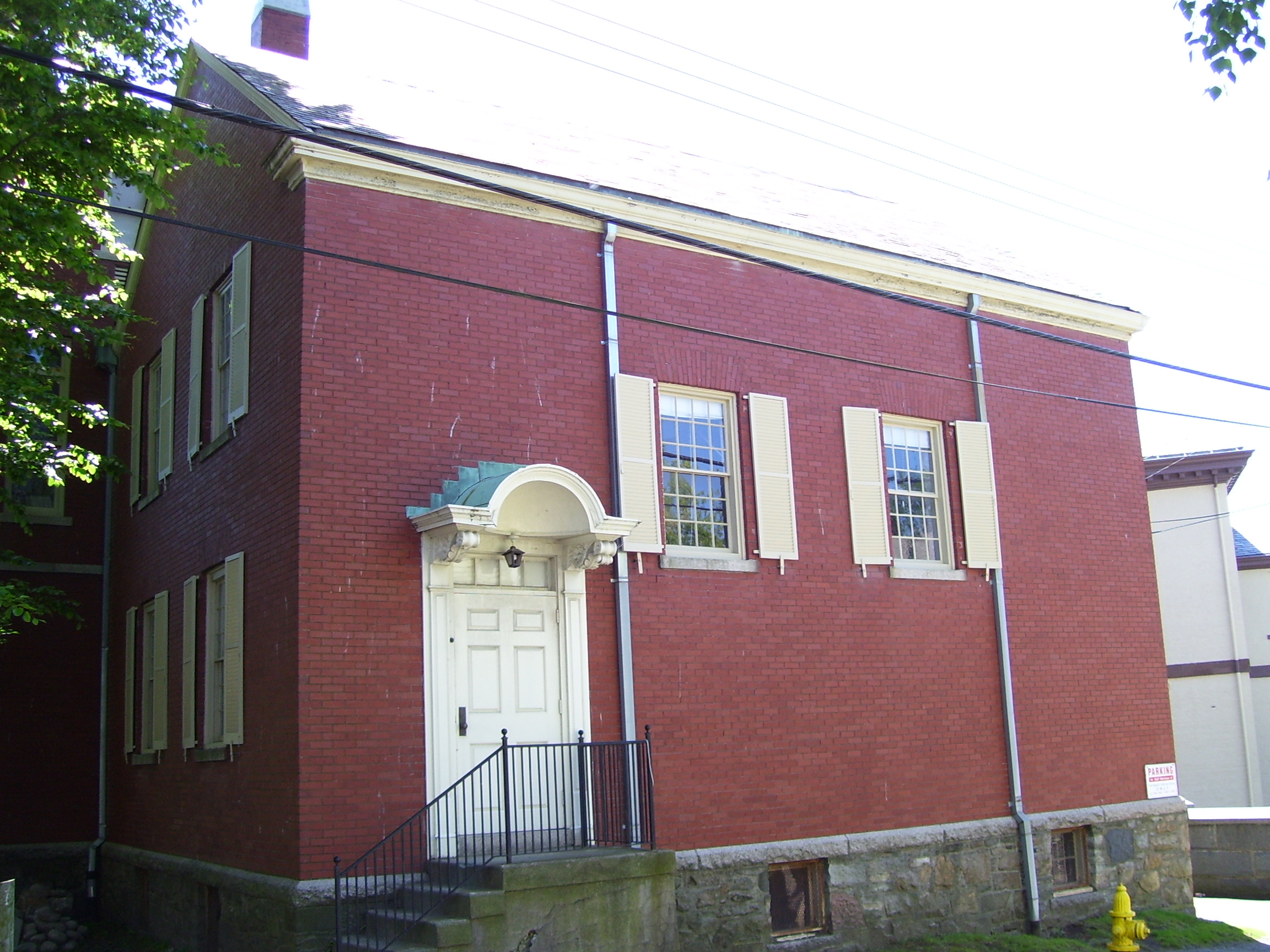
Sabbatarian Meeting House, built in 1729 by Richard Munday (rear Newport Historical Society building today), now encased in brick

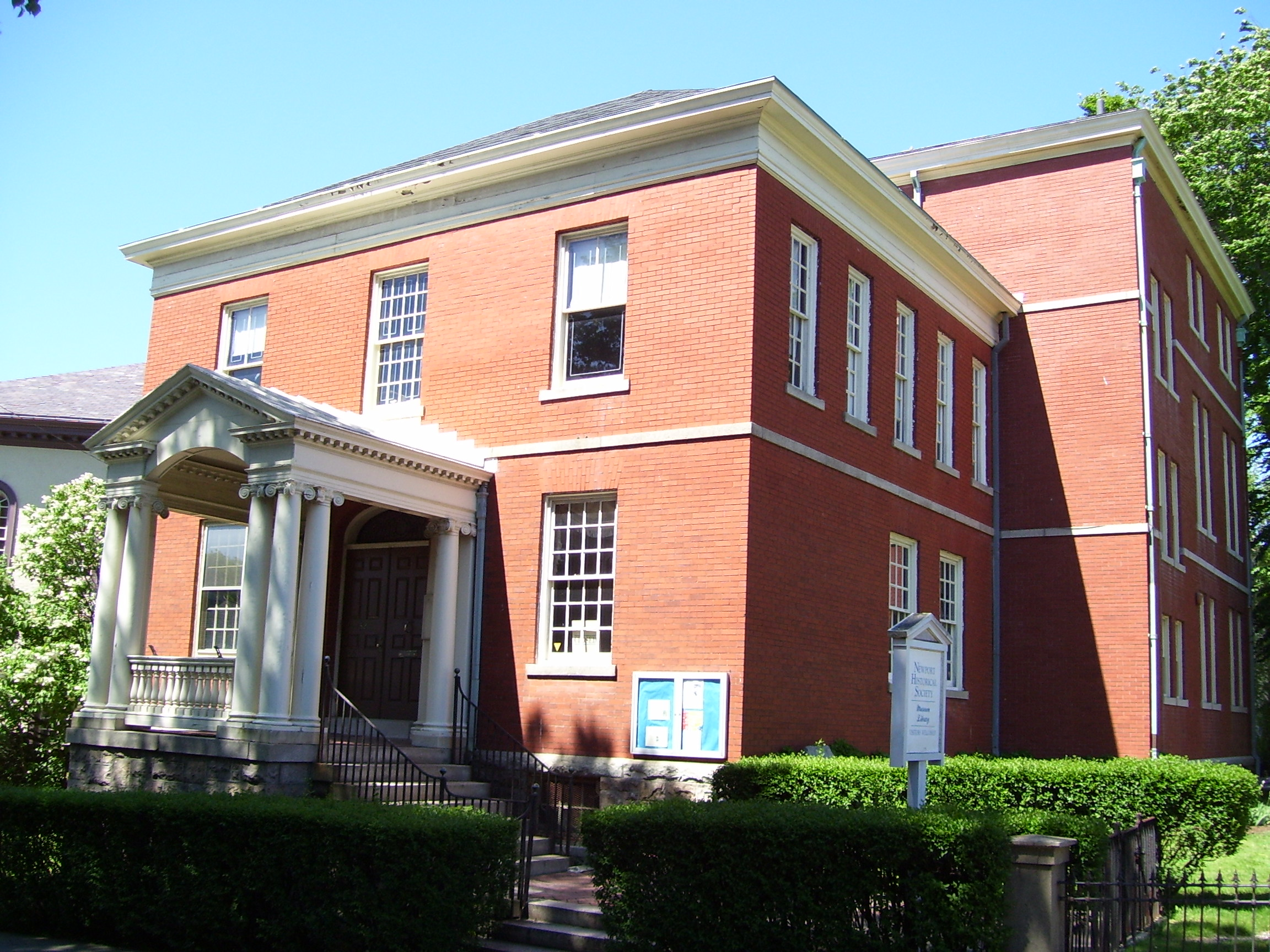
front Newport Historical Society library building today

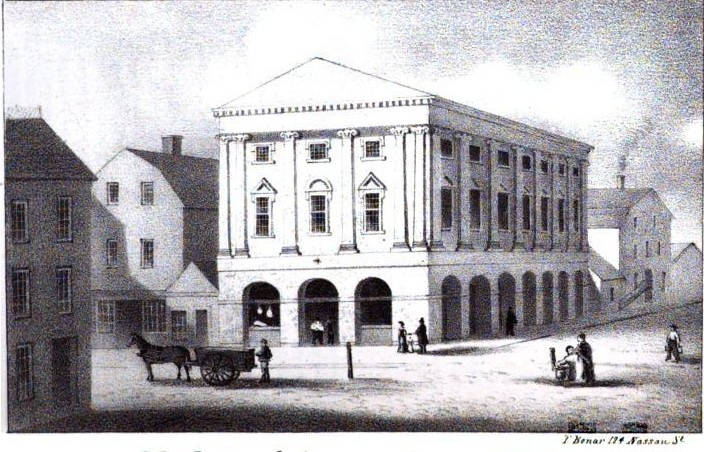
The Old Brick Market building currently houses the society's Museum of Newport History

Although the society was chartered in 1854, its collections originated thirty years earlier as the "Southern Cabinet" of the Rhode Island Historical Society, which was founded in 1822. By 1853, several prominent Newporters, including William Shepard Wetmore, recognized the need for a separate organization specifically devoted to preserving the history of Newport County, and the collections of the Southern Cabinet were reorganized under the auspices of the Newport Historical Society.

Ground was broken in 1902 for a brick library building at 82 Touro Street, which would be attached to the Sabbatarian Meeting House (previously acquired from Seventh Day Baptists by the society). The new building provided office space for the society, a fireproof vault for historic documents, and a library. In 1915, the meeting house was detached from the library and moved to the rear of the lot. A three-story brick building was constructed between the library and the meeting house. Brick veneer, a slate roof, and steel shutters were added to the exterior of the meeting house to make its exterior covering consistent with the adjoining structures, and to provide added protection from the weather and the threat of fire.

The society features changing exhibits and has extensive holdings of colonial, silver, china, portraits, ship models, and over two hundred thousand historic photographs. Research facilities include archives with manuscript materials including the earliest town records, merchant account books, church records, etc. The library contains the second largest genealogical collection in Rhode Island. Walking tours leave from the Museum of Newport History.

== Properties ==
Image	Name	Year built (*circa)	Style	Architect	Location	Refs
	The Richard I. Burnham Resource Center	c. 1902			82 Touro Street	
	Brick Market	1762	Georgian	Peter Harrison	127 Thames Street	
	Wanton–Lyman–Hazard House	c. 1697	Colonial, Georgian		17 Broadway	
	Great Friends Meeting House	1699			30 Farewell Street	
	Old Colony House	1736-1739	Georgian	Richard Munday	Washington Square	

== Collections ==
- Museum collection
- Photographs and graphics collections
- Library collections

=== Special library collections ===
The major categories of library special collections at the Newport Historical Society are:

- Business records
- Maritime records
- Church records
- Family papers
- Diaries and journals
- African-American history
- Municipal records
- Other collections

== See also ==
- List of historical societies in Rhode Island
- List of libraries in Rhode Island
