= Museum of Newport History =

- Brick Market
- U.S. National Register of Historic Places
- U.S. National Historic Landmark
- U.S. National Historic Landmark District – Contributing property
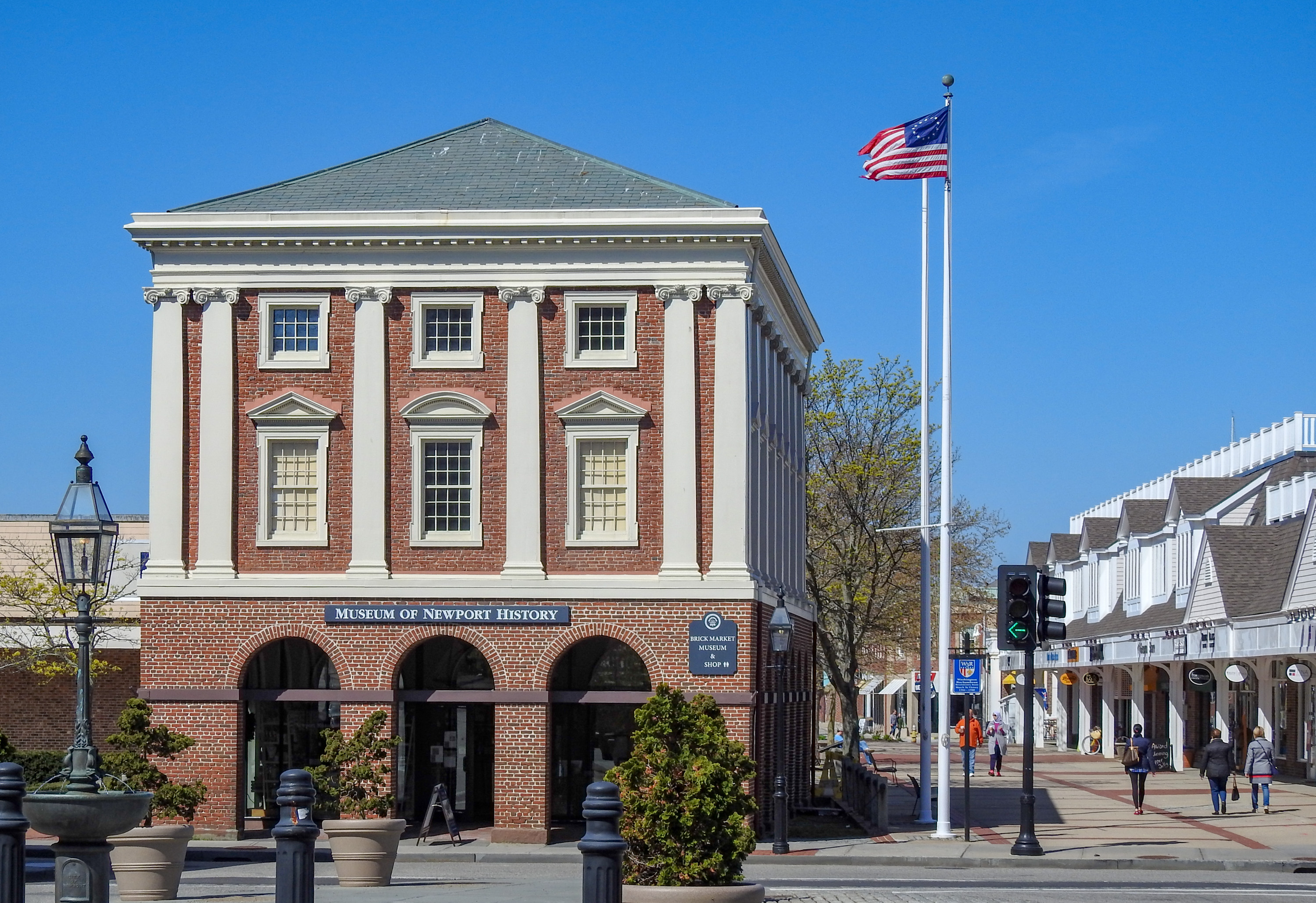
- The building in 2016

- Location within Rhode Island Location within the United States
- Location: Newport, RI
- Coordinates: 41°29′23″N 71°18′58″W
- Built: 1762
- Architect: Harrison, Peter
- Architectural style: Georgian architecture
- Part of: Newport Historic District (ID68000001)
- NRHP reference No.: 66000019

Significant dates
- Added to NRHP: October 15, 1966
- Designated NHL: October 9, 1960
- Designated NHLDCP: November 24, 1968

The Museum of Newport History is a history museum in the Old Brick Market building in the heart of Newport, Rhode Island, United States. It is owned and operated by the Newport Historical Society at 127 Thames Street on Washington Square. The building, designed by noted 18th-century American architect Peter Harrison and built in the 1760s, is a National Historic Landmark.

== Description ==
The Brick Market is a three-story brick structure with a low hip roof. Its ground floor has round-arch openings, which were historically open but have mostly been glassed over. The upper level bays are separated by large pilasters with Ionic capitals, with a dentillated cornice below the roof. The second floor windows are rectangular sash, topped by alternating gable and segmented-arch pediments. The third floor windows are square, with a simpler molded surround. The interior has been extensively altered over time, with little historic material surviving.

== History ==
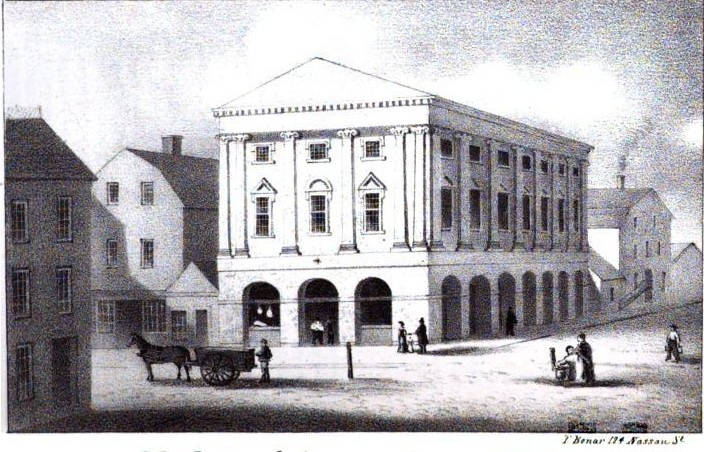
1853 picture of the Brick Market building, home to the Museum of Newport History

The Brick Market was designed by Peter Harrison, a major architect working in the British colonies during the 18th century. Harrison based the Georgian design on a part of the 17th century design of Somerset House by Inigo Jones, altering the building material from stone to brick, and replacing Jones' Corinthian capitals with those of the Ionic order.

Construction of the building was authorized by the city in 1761 and begun in 1762, but the merchant proprietors ran out of money after finishing just the first level, and the city took the project over, roofing that level. The building was not completed until 1772. As a traditional British style market house (like Boston's Faneuil Hall), the building's first level was an open-air arcade that served as a marketplace for various goods. Profits from the building went into a city fund for the establishment of a granary.

The upper levels of the hall have seen a variety of uses. In the later years of the 18th century it housed a printing operation, and was eventually converted into a theatre. In 1842 it began to be used as town hall, and the third floor was removed, replaced by galleries around the sides and rear. It served as Newport's city hall between 1853 and 1900. In the late 1920s the building was subjected to an extensive rehabilitation under the auspices of restorationist Norman Isham. It was listed on the National Register of Historic Places in 1968, and designated a National Historic Landmark in 1968. It is also a contributing element of the Newport Historic District, also a National Historic Landmark.

The building is now owned by the Newport Historical Society. It houses a museum detailing Newport's history from pre-colonial times to the Gilded Age and beyond. Exhibits include the printing press of James Franklin, the figurehead from the yacht Aloha, and a sword given as a gift by the Marquis de Lafayette to Daniel Lyman.

== See also ==
- List of National Historic Landmarks in Rhode Island
- National Register of Historic Places listings in Newport County, Rhode Island
- Bellevue Avenue Historic District
- Ocean Drive Historic District

== Images ==
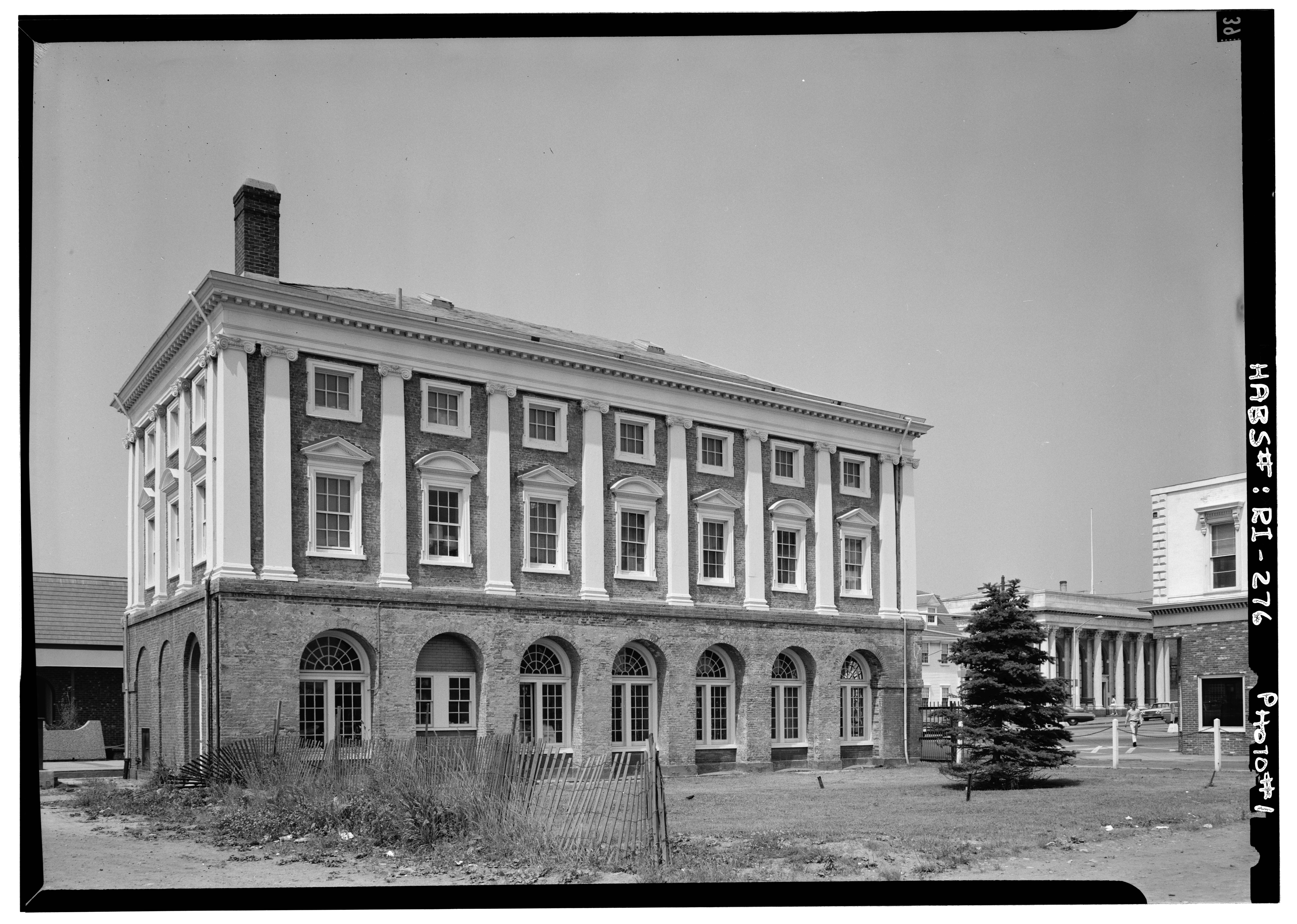
View of the South Facade in 1971

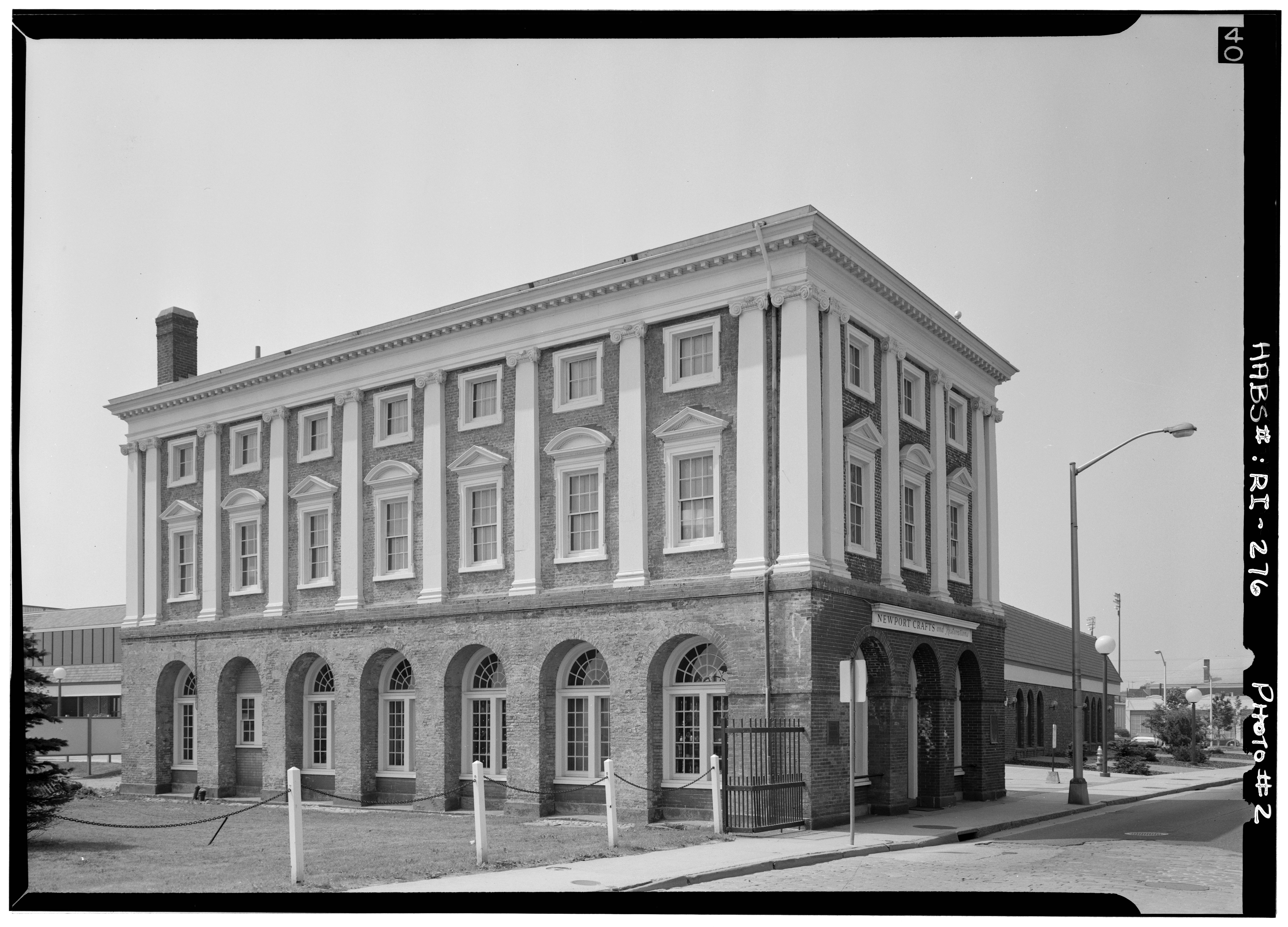
View of Exterior from Southeast, 1971
