= Richard Munday =

Colonial American architect

Munday's simple plans for Ayrault House, 1739

Munday's door hood on the Ayrault House

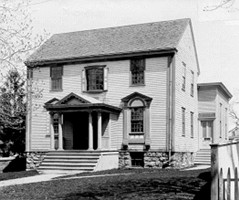
Sabbatarian Meeting House (Newport Historical Society building today)

Richard Munday (c.1685-1739) was a prominent colonial American architect and builder in Newport, Rhode Island.

Munday built several notable public buildings in Newport between 1720 and 1739 helping to modernize the city. Christopher Wren's church of St. James at Piccadilly in London, England, and Old North Church in Boston, are believed to have greatly influenced Munday's baroque style. Munday also built many Georgian houses in Newport and was a parishioner at Trinity Church. Few details about his life have survived.

== Works by Munday ==
- Old Colony House, 1739, a U.S. National Historic Landmark (NHL)
- Sabbatarian Meeting House (currently home of the Newport Historical Society), 1729
- Trinity Church, Newport, 1725, also an NHL
- Daniel Ayrault house, Newport, 1739-40 (built with Benjamin Wyatt)
- Malbone Castle and Estate, 1739-40 (resembled Colony House, destroyed in 1766 fire)
- Malbone town house, 1729 (demolished)
- Jahleel Brent House, (possible contributor)
- John Gidley House, (possible contributor)

== External links and references ==
- James D. Kornwolf, Georgiana Wallis Kornwolf, Architecture and Town Planning in Colonial North America, (JHU Press, 2002), pg. 1026
- Preservation Society pictures of Munday's works
- Antoinette F. Downing, Early Homes of Rhode Island (Richmond, VA: Gt: 1937)
- A. F. Downing & V.J.Scully, The Architectural Heritage of Newport Rhode Island 1640-1915 (NY: Bramhill, 1967)
- Henry Russell Hitchcock, Rhode Island Architecture, (Providence: Mus. Pres., 1939)
