= Ira Rakatansky =

American architect

- Born: October 3, 1919; Providence, Rhode Island
- Died: March 4, 2014 (aged 94); Providence, Rhode Island
- Education: Harvard Graduate School of Design
- Occupation: Architect

Ira Rakatansky (October 3, 1919 – March 4, 2014) was a modernist architect from, and based in, Rhode Island. He studied modern architecture under Walter Gropius and Marcel Breuer at the Harvard Graduate School of Design.

== Life and work ==
Ira Rakatansky was born in Rhode Island to Russian emigrants to America, Benjamin and Martha (Bornstein) Rakatansky. In 1942 Rakatansky received a Diploma in Architecture from Rhode Island School of Design. He entered the architecture school at Harvard in 1943. In 1945 and 1946 he received his Bachelor of Architecture and his Master of Architecture degrees from the Harvard Graduate School of Design. Rakatansky was awarded the Wheelwright Prize to work on his master's degree at Harvard.

In 1946 Rakatansky established an independent practice within the office of architect Samuel M. Morino. In 1948 he established a collaborative practice with engineer Samuel Lerner before establishing his own practice in Providence, Rhode Island in 1949.

In 1965 he was president of AIA Rhode Island, a chapter of the American Institute of Architects.

== Chronology of work ==
Works built:

- 1947, Halsband House, East Greenwich, Rhode Island
- 1948, Medical Office Building, Providence, Rhode Island
- 1948, Miller House, Providence, Rhode Island
- 1948, Weinstein House, Providence, Rhode Island
- 1949, Camp Walt Whitman Dining Hall, Pike, New Hampshire
- 1949, Reversible Chair
- 1949, Weisberg House, Newport, Rhode Island
- 1950, Horn House, Rehoboth, Massachusetts
- 1950, Wax House, Providence, Rhode Island
- 1950, Feingold House, Providence, Rhode Island
- 1950, Zitserman House, Providence, Rhode Island
- 1951, Blanding House, Greene, Rhode Island
- 1952, Osburne House, Hampton, Connecticut
- 1953, Blanding's Pharmacy, Providence, Rhode Island
- 1953, Pollock House, Attleboro, Massachusetts
- 1954, Falk House, Narragansett, Rhode Island
- 1954, Rakatansky House, Lincoln, Rhode Island
- 1954, Spring Green Memorial Church, Warwick, Rhode Island
- 1955, Dunn House, Lexington, Massachusetts
- 1955, Franeck House, East Greenwich, Rhode Island
- 1955, Rosen House, Pawtucket, Rhode Island
- 1955, Starr House, Lexington, Massachusetts
- 1955, Ziskind House, Middletown, Rhode Island
- 1955, Renovations to Broad Street Synagogue, Providence, Rhode Island
- 1956, Miller House, Providence, Rhode Island
- 1957, Rogers House, Weekapaug, Rhode Island
- 1957, Rogge House, Stamford, Connecticut
- 1957, Shipyard Drive-in Theatre, Providence, Rhode Island
- 1958, Blieden House, Warwick, Rhode Island
- 1958, Levin House, Woonsocket, Rhode Island
- 1958, Myers House and Office, Providence, Rhode Island
- 1958, Rakatansky House, Providence, Rhode Island
- 1958, Temple Beth Am, Warwick, Rhode Island
- 1958, Ten Pin Lanes Bowling, Providence, Rhode Island
- 1959, 15 Meeting Street, Providence, Rhode Island
- 1959, Caldarone House, North Providence, Rhode Island
- 1960, Atlantic Bowling, East Providence, Rhode Island
- 1960, Baker House, Providence, Rhode Island
- 1960, Greenwood Nurseries, Warwick, Rhode Island
- 1960, Simon House, Providence, Rhode Island
- 1961, Reck House, Acapesket, Massachusetts
- 1962, Meadow-Glen Twin Drive-In, Medford, Massachusetts
- 1962, Burnight House, Barrington, Rhode Island
- 1963, Waring House, Virgin Islands
- 1964, Church of God and Saints of Christ, Providence, Rhode Island
- 1967, Teamster Administration Building, Providence, Rhode Island
- 1968, Chisholm House, Barrington, Rhode Island
- 1968, Gravdahl House, Jamestown, Rhode Island
- 1968, Harper House, Little Compton, Rhode Island
- 1969, Aber House, Tiverton, Rhode Island
- 1969, General Wine Company Warehouse, Providence, Rhode Island
- 1970, Collier House, Little Compton, Rhode Island
- 1971, Bishop Plummer House, Suffolk, Virginia
- 1971, Connecticut Laborers' Union, Hartford, Connecticut
- 1971, Patterson House, Jamestown, Rhode Island
- 1972, Connecticut Laborers' Union, West Haven, Connecticut
- 1974, Glifford House, Matunuck, Rhode Island
- 1975, Peterborough Convalescence Homes, Peterborough, New Hampshire
- 1976, Persimmon Restaurant, Providence, Rhode Island
- 1978, Arnold House, Tiverton, Rhode Island
- 1979, Brown University Faculty Club addition, Providence, Rhode Island
- 1980, Church of God and Saints of Christ, Suffolk, Virginia
- 1980, Starr-Naylor House, Brookline, Massachusetts
- 1981, Rakatansky Office Addition, Providence, Rhode Island
- 1982, Bishop Plummer, Jr. House, Suffolk, Virginia
- 1983, Saber House, Barrington, Rhode Island
- 1984, New England Laborers' Training Academy (Dining Hall), Pomfret, Connecticut
- 1985, Church of God and Saints of Christ (sanctuary addition), Suffolk, Virginia
- 1985, New England Laborers' Training Academy (dormitory), Pomfret, Connecticut
- 1986, Holocaust Memorial, Providence, Rhode Island
- 1986, Slepkow House, Providence, Rhode Island
- 1988, New England Laborers' Training Academy, Hopkinton, Massachusetts
- 1992, Rosen House, Pawcatuck, Connecticut

== Bibliography ==
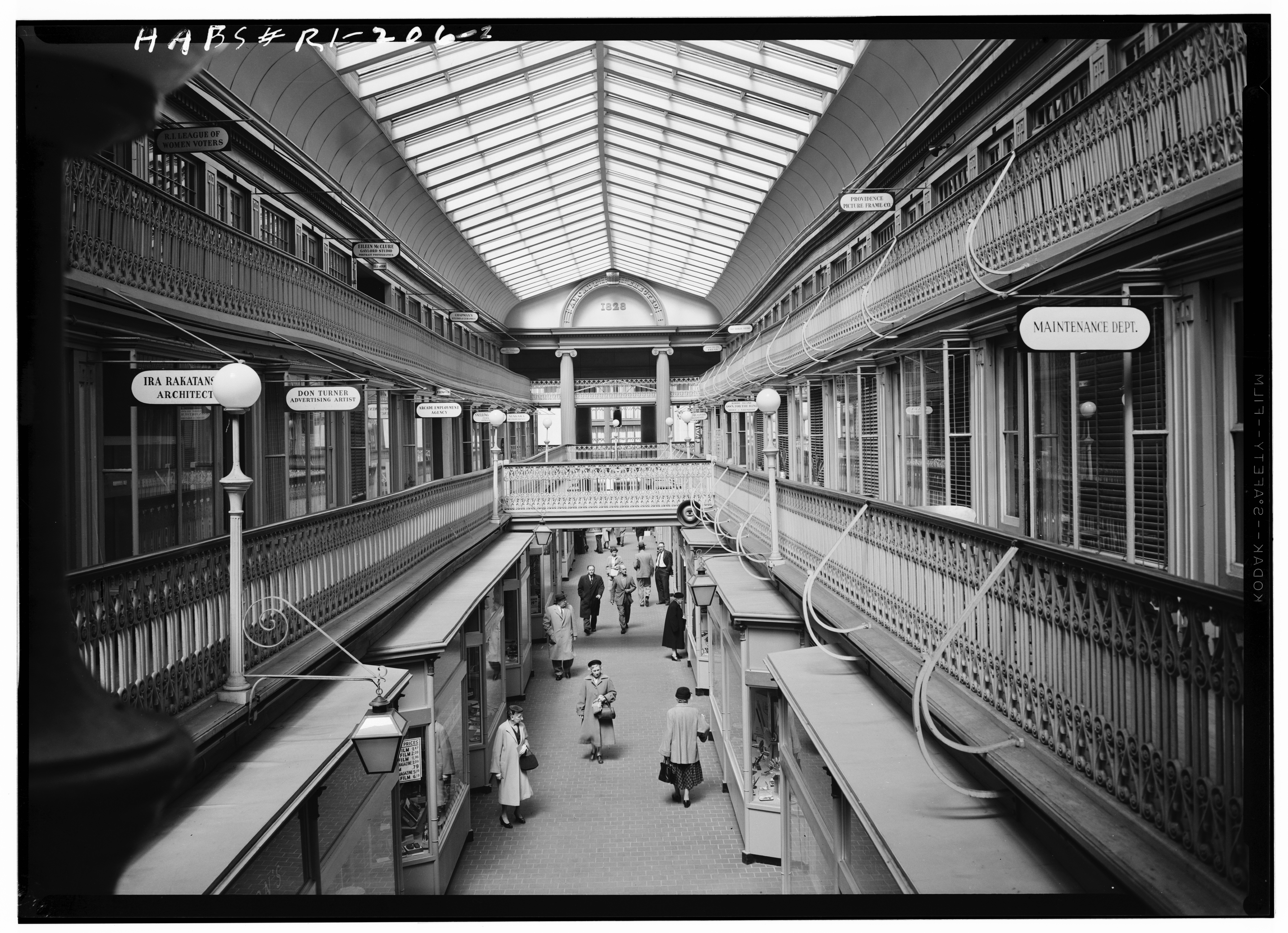
Rakatansky's office in 1958, at the Westminster Arcade.

- Caserta, John; Widder, Lynnette, eds. (2010). Ira Rakatansky: As Modern As Tomorrow. Rhode Island School of Design Architecture Series. Rhode Island School of Design, Department of Architecture: William Stout Publishers. ISBN 978-0-9819667-0-0. LCCN 2009941913.
