= Edwin T. Banning =

American architect (1864–1940)

Edwin Thomas Banning
- Born: May 11, 1864; Danielson, Connecticut, US
- Died: May 18, 1940 (aged 76); San Diego, California, US
- Education: Brown University
- Occupation: Architect

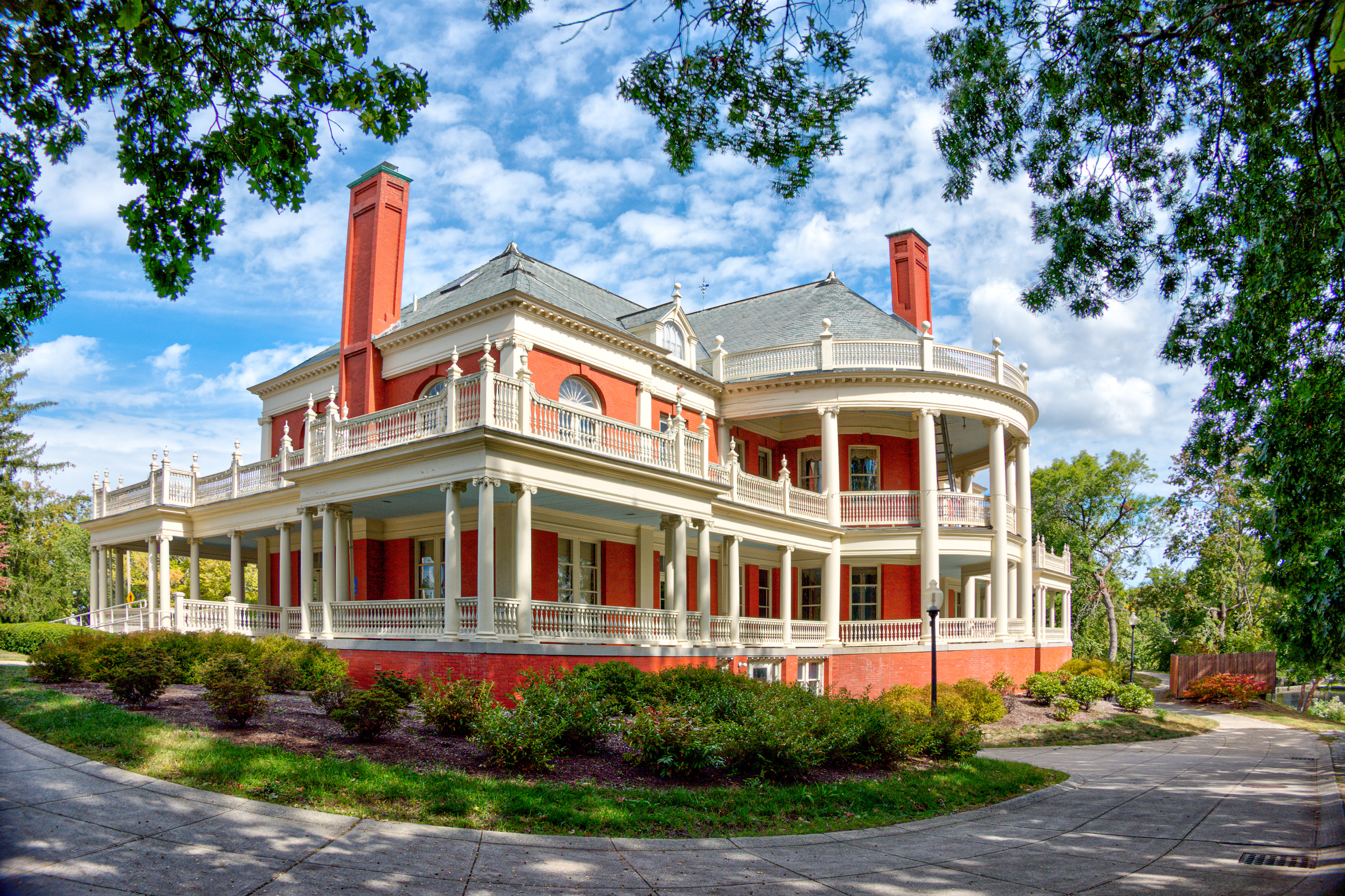
Casino, Roger Williams Park, Providence, Rhode Island. 1896, designed by Banning

Edwin Thomas Banning (May 11, 1864 – May 18, 1940) was an American architect.

== Biography ==
The fourth of six children, Banning was born in on May 11, 1864, Danielson, Connecticut, to Rev. Carlos and Harriet Elizabeth (Pitman) Banning. Natives of Newport, Rhode Island, they returned there when their son was very young. He attended Rogers High School and Brown University. He dropped out in his junior year, and began working as a draftsman for Gould & Angell, prominent Providence architects.

Edwin Banning married Isabella Thornton (1864–1915) on June 13, 1883, in Taunton, Massachusetts. They had one daughter, Bernice Thornton Banning (1885–1954). After the death of Isabella, he married Agnes Gertrude Cristadoro (1879–1928) November 1920 in San Diego, California.

Banning established an office in Providence in the mid-1890s. He began to specialize in public buildings, including a number of schools. He relocated his office to Newport in 1900, and back to Providence in 1903. Later that year, he made his brother-in-law, Henry C. Thornton, a partner in Banning & Thornton. The association continued until 1912, when Banning went west to San Diego. He continued to practice as an architect, and died there on May 18, 1940, aged 76.

== Architectural works ==
Edwin T. Banning, before 1903:

- Casino, Roger Williams Park, Providence, RI (1896)
- Hospital and Gymnasium, Sockanosset School for Boys, Howard, RI (1898) - Demolished.
- Wayland Park School, 15 Curtis St., Cranston, RI (1898) - Demolished.
- Y. M. C. A. Gymnasium, 41 Mary St., Newport, RI (1900–01) - Demolished.
- Middletown Free Library (Old), 1251 W. Main Rd., Middletown, RI (1902)

Banning & Thornton, 1903–1912:

- Cranston High School (Old), 845 Park Ave., Cranston, RI (1903–04)
- Warwick High School (Old), 319 Providence St., West Warwick, RI (1904–05) - Highly altered.
- Humboldt Avenue Fire Station, 155 Humboldt Ave., Providence, RI (1905)
- Old State House (Remodeling), 150 Benefit St., Providence, RI (1906)
- Rhode Island Building, Jamestown Exposition, Norfolk, VA (1906–07) - Demolished.
- Arlington Grammar School, 1090 Cranston St., Cranston, RI (1907) - Demolished.
- Norwood Avenue Grammar School, 205 Norwood Ave., Cranston, RI (1907) - Highly altered.
- East Providence High School (Old), 20 Whelden Ave., East Providence, RI (1908–09)
- Temple Beth-El, 688 Broad St., Providence, RI (1910–11)
- Gleason House, Rhode Island School for the Feeble-Minded, Exeter, RI (1912) - Demolished.

Edwin T. Banning, from 1912:

- St. Vincent R. C. Church, 4080 Hawk St., San Diego, CA (1913) - Demolished.
