= Old State House (Providence, Rhode Island) =

- Sixth District Court House (Old State House)
- U.S. National Register of Historic Places
- U.S. National Historic Landmark District – Contributing property
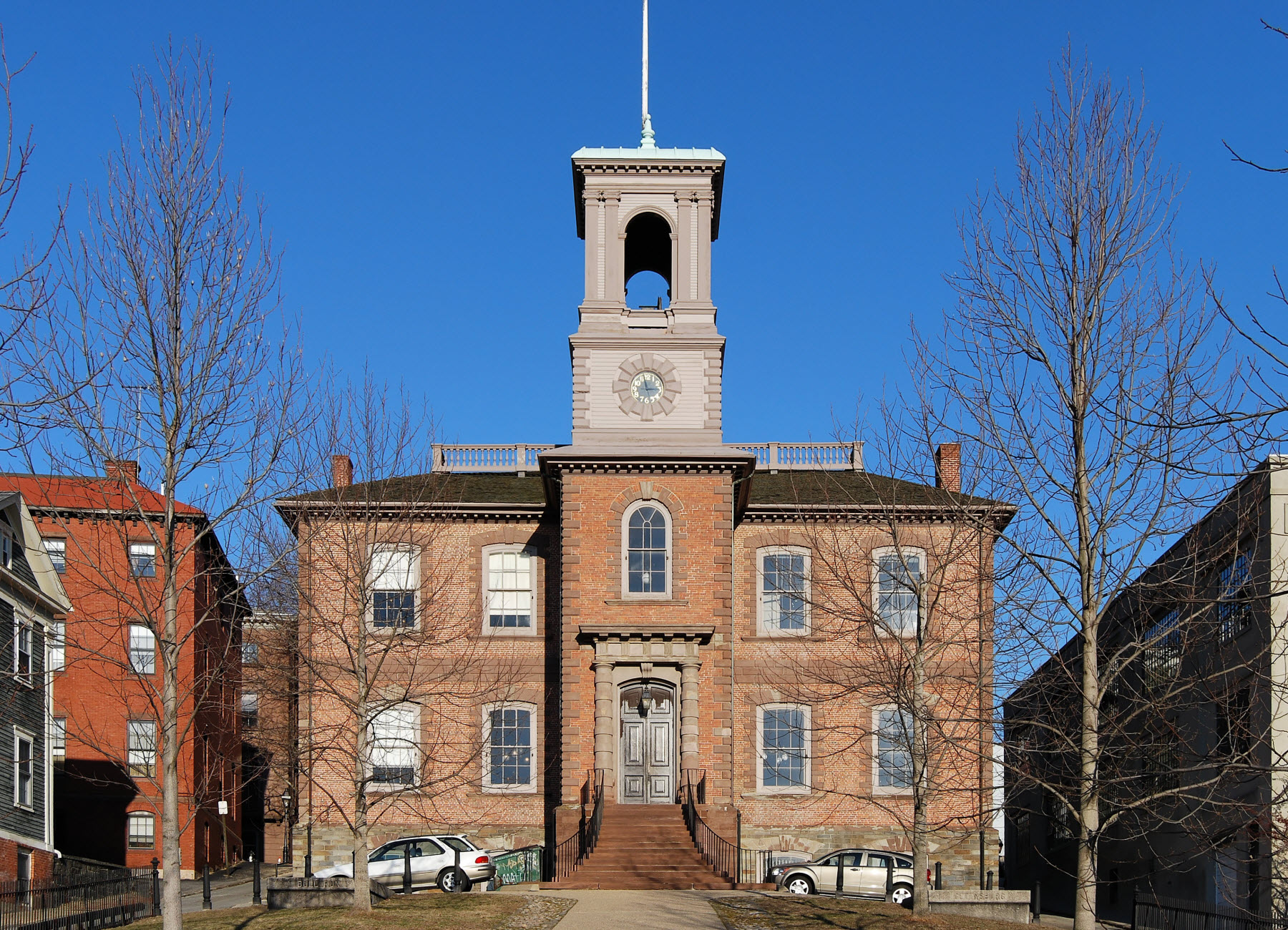
- Old State House in 2008

- Location within Rhode Island Location within the United States
- Interactive map showing the location for Old State House
- Location: 150 Benefit St., Providence, Rhode Island
- Coordinates: 41°49′44″N 71°24′34″W
- Built: 1762
- Architectural style: Georgian architecture
- Part of: College Hill Historic District (ID70000019)
- NRHP reference No.: 70000092

Significant dates
- Added to NRHP: April 28, 1970
- Designated NHLDCP: November 10, 1970

The Old State House on College Hill in Providence, Rhode Island, also known as Providence Sixth District Court House, Providence Colony House, Providence County House, and Rhode Island State House is located on 150 Benefit Street, with the front facade facing North Main Street. It is a brick Georgian-style building largely completed in 1762. It was used as the meeting place for the colonial and state legislatures for 149 years.

On May 4, 1776, meeting in the building, the General Assembly declared its independence, renouncing its allegiance to the British crown, and the date is now celebrated as Rhode Island Independence Day. Debates about slavery occurred in the building in the late 18th century. George Washington visited the building in 1781 and 1790. Other visitors to the building in the 18th and 19th centuries included Frederick Douglass and Susan B. Anthony.

== History ==
=== Early history ===
From colonial times to the mid-19th century, the Rhode Island General Assembly rotated meetings between the state's five county court houses; five of these former Rhode Island state houses survive today. In 1730, a statehouse known as the Providence Colony House or County House was built on Meeting Street on the site now occupied by the Brick Schoolhouse. The wooden building burned down in December 1758.

In 1760 The General Assembly constructed the current building as the new Providence Colony House, on a site which overlooked The Parade, the location of ceremonial processions. The new building, which was smaller than the building is now, was based on the Colony House in Newport, Rhode Island, which was the first Colony House built, and served as a model for others.

The building was constructed of Flemish bond brick with rusticated brownstone quoins and wooden trim. It was largely finished by 1762 with some details being completed as late as 1771. Many of the Georgian details were borrowed from the larger and more ornate Newport Colony House. The building's interior, specifically, resembled the Newport building, following the traditional layout of English town halls. Prior to 19th century alterations to the Providence State House, the two buildings greatly resembled one another

After 1853 the state legislature ceased meeting at Kent, Washington and Bristol county courthouses, but continued to alternate its sessions between the Colony Houses in Providence and Newport into the early 20th century.

=== 19th and 20th century ===
The building was extensively renovated and dramatically altered several times in the 19th century.

In 1840, the building was remodeled by Rhode Island architect, Russell Warren. This renovation involved the replacement of original windows with sash windows and the rearragement of portions of the interior.

It was again altered in 1850, when Thomas A. Tefft of Tallman & Bucklin added the large tower facing Main Street, and a reorganization of nearly the entire interior. In 1867 James C. Bucklin designed an addition on Benefit Street that nearly doubled the size of the building. Both of these additions were sympathetic to the building's original design. The building was refurbished in 1877–1883, to designs by Stone & Carpenter.

The building served as the legislature's meeting place until 1901, when the new Rhode Island State House began being occupied. The building was completely finished in 1904, and it was decided to use the old building as a courthouse. Major internal alterations by Banning & Thornton were completed in 1906, and the building re-opened as the Sixth District Courthouse.

By 1901 the new Rhode Island State House was occupied on Smith Hill and the legislature vacated the Old State House, although it remained in use as a Court House until 1975.

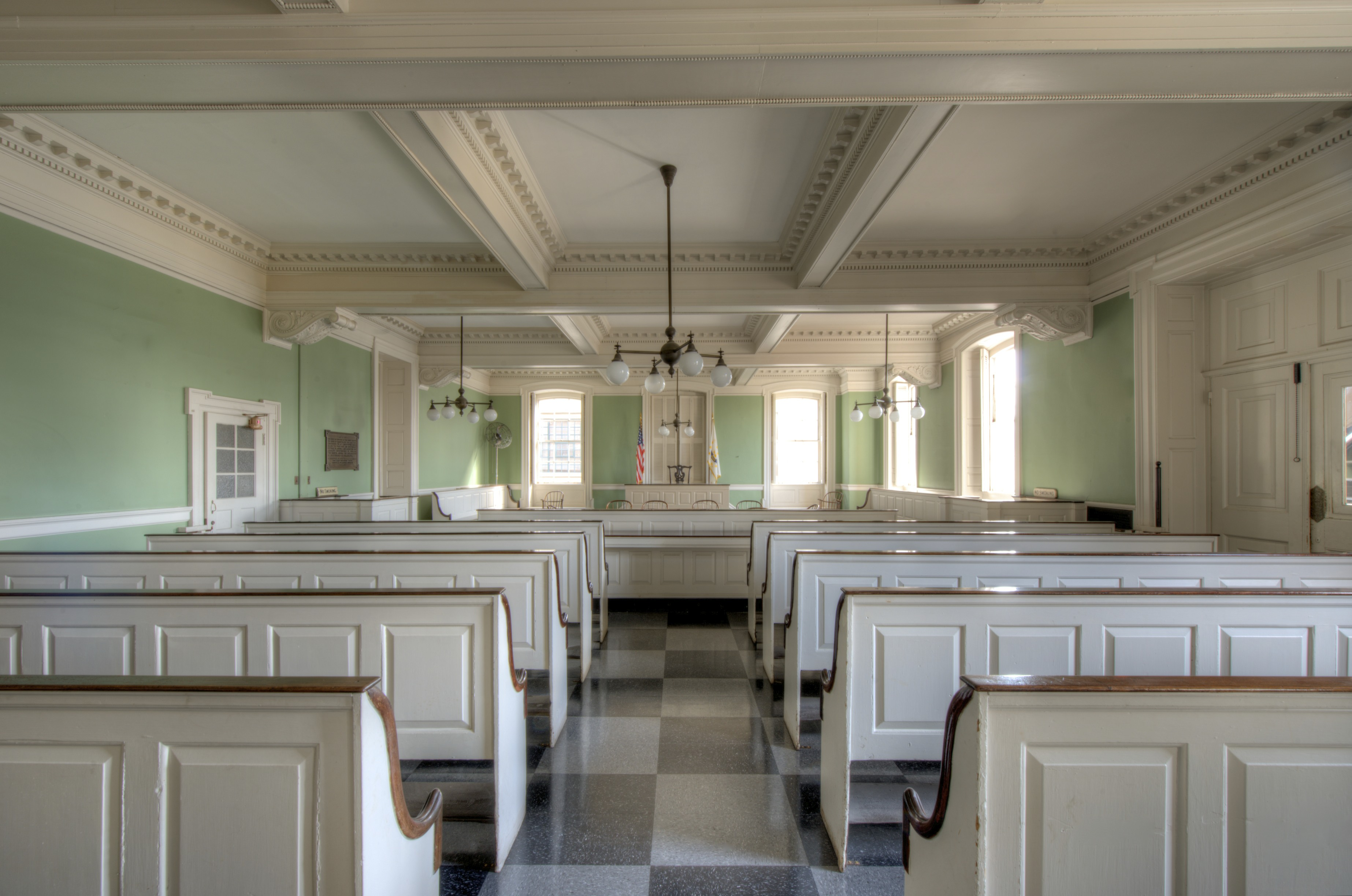
The Council Chamber retains its original furnishings

In 1970 the building was added to the National Register of Historic Places; the following year the building was listed a contributing structure to the College Hill Historic District.

Since 1975, the building has been home to the Rhode Island Historical Preservation Commission, which oversees it maintenance and renovation. In 2020, the building underwent a renovation and restoration effort.

== Interior ==
An open space hall for public meeting was located on the main floor and later became a courtroom.

On the second floor was the House of Representatives and Senate chambers. Additional space was created for the governor's and secretary of state's offices. Today, the former Council Chamber is the only room to retain its original furnishings. As a result of the various expansions and renovations, the only room in the building which is largely original is the office of the secretary of state on the second floor.

== Gallery ==
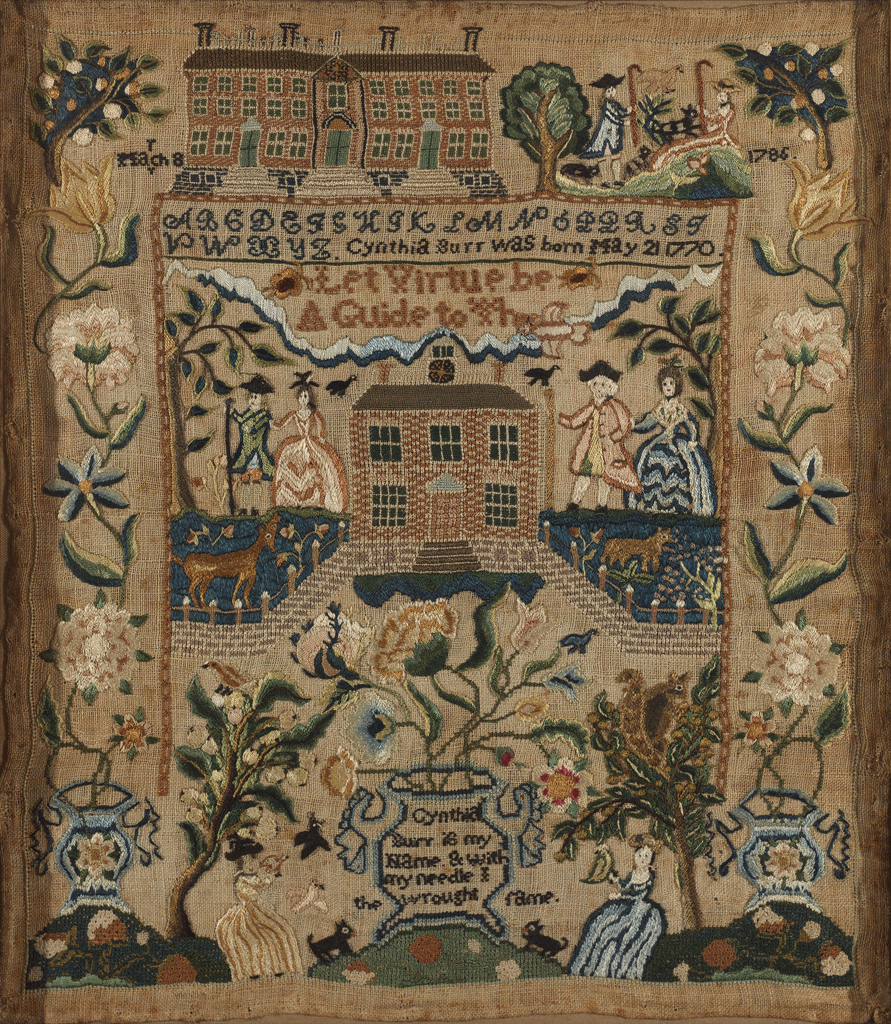
This 1786 sampler depicts the Old State House (center) and University Hall (upper right)

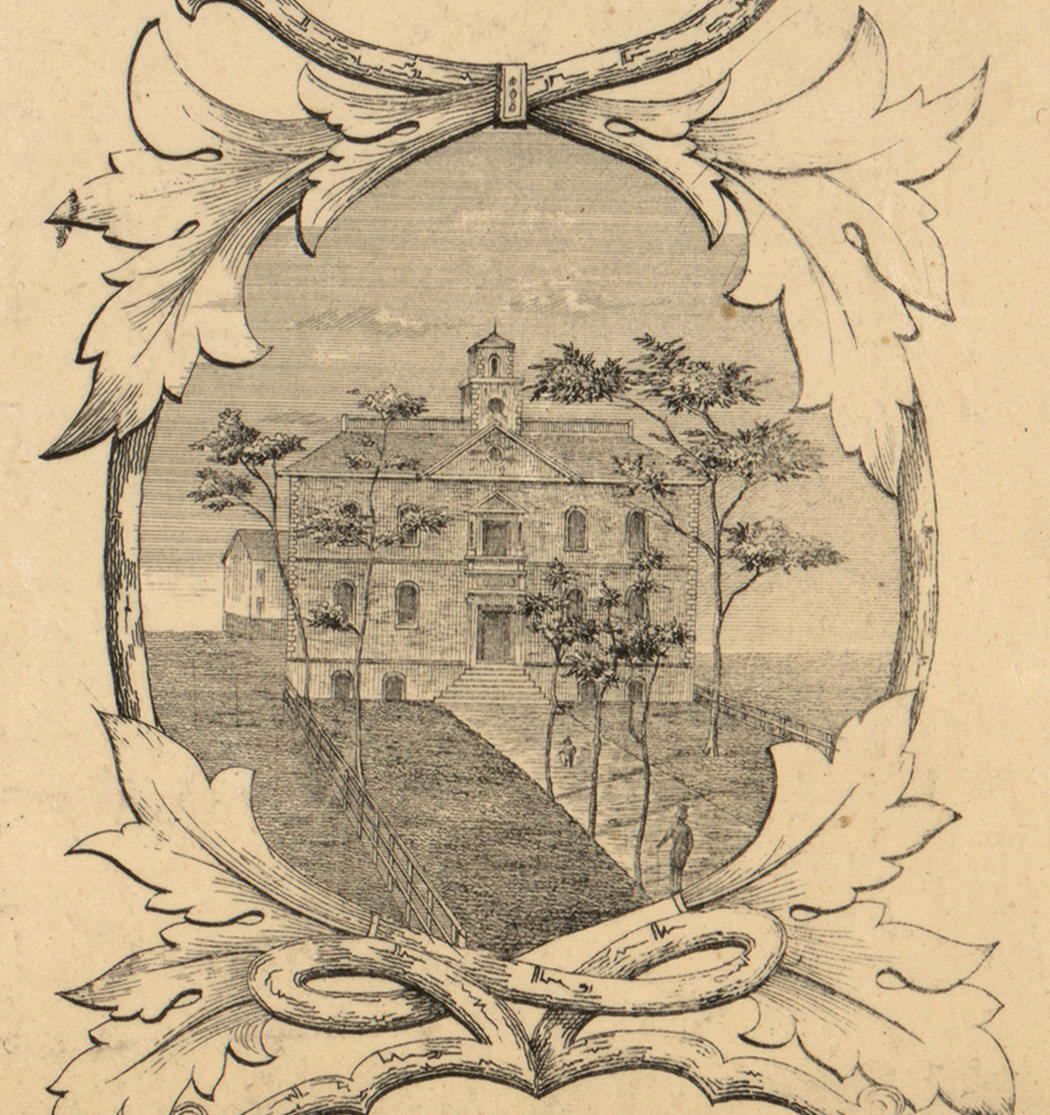
An 1851 engraving showing the building as it appeared before alterations to the exterior.

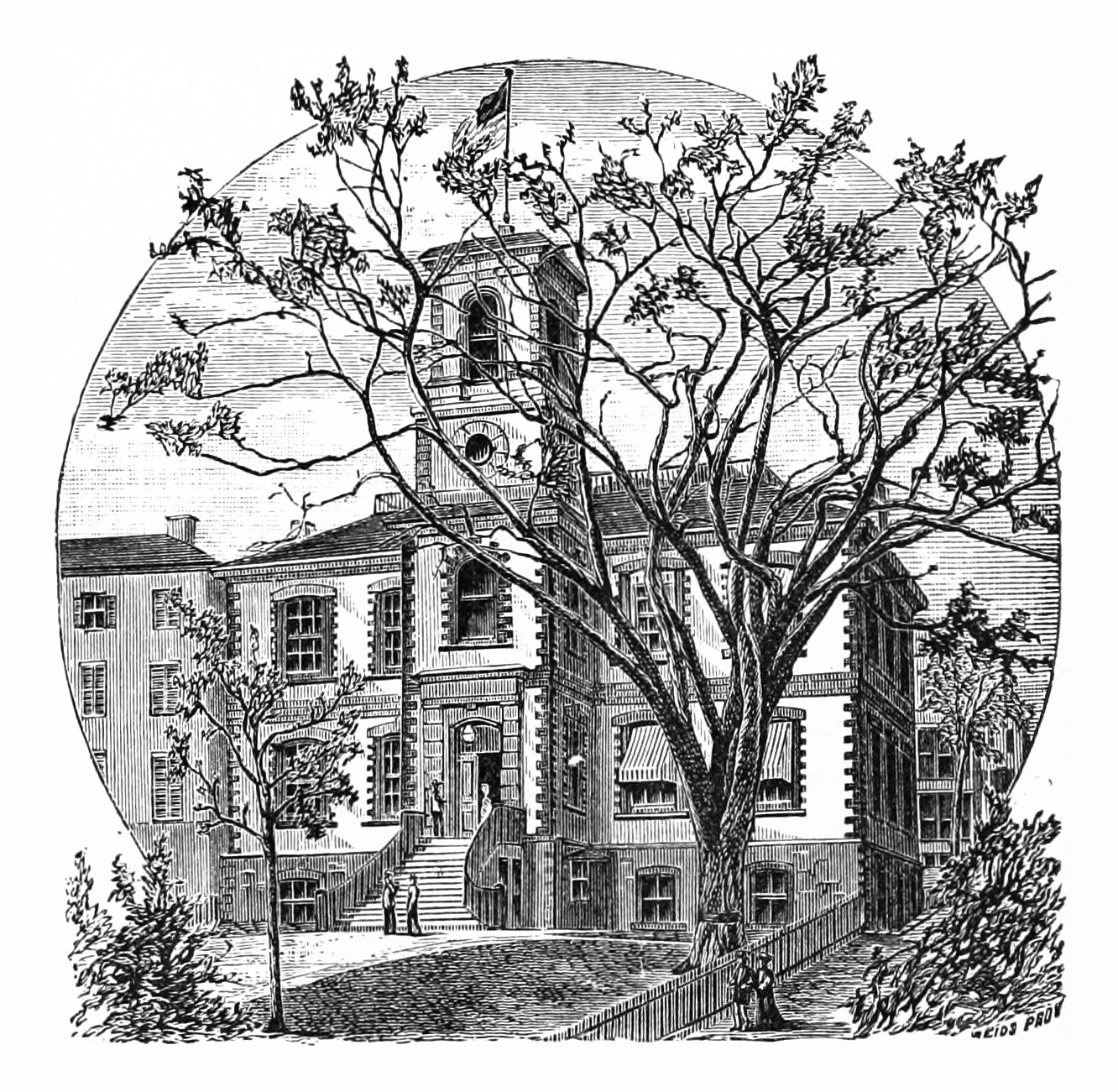
This 1881 engraving shows the building after the 1850 addition of the tower

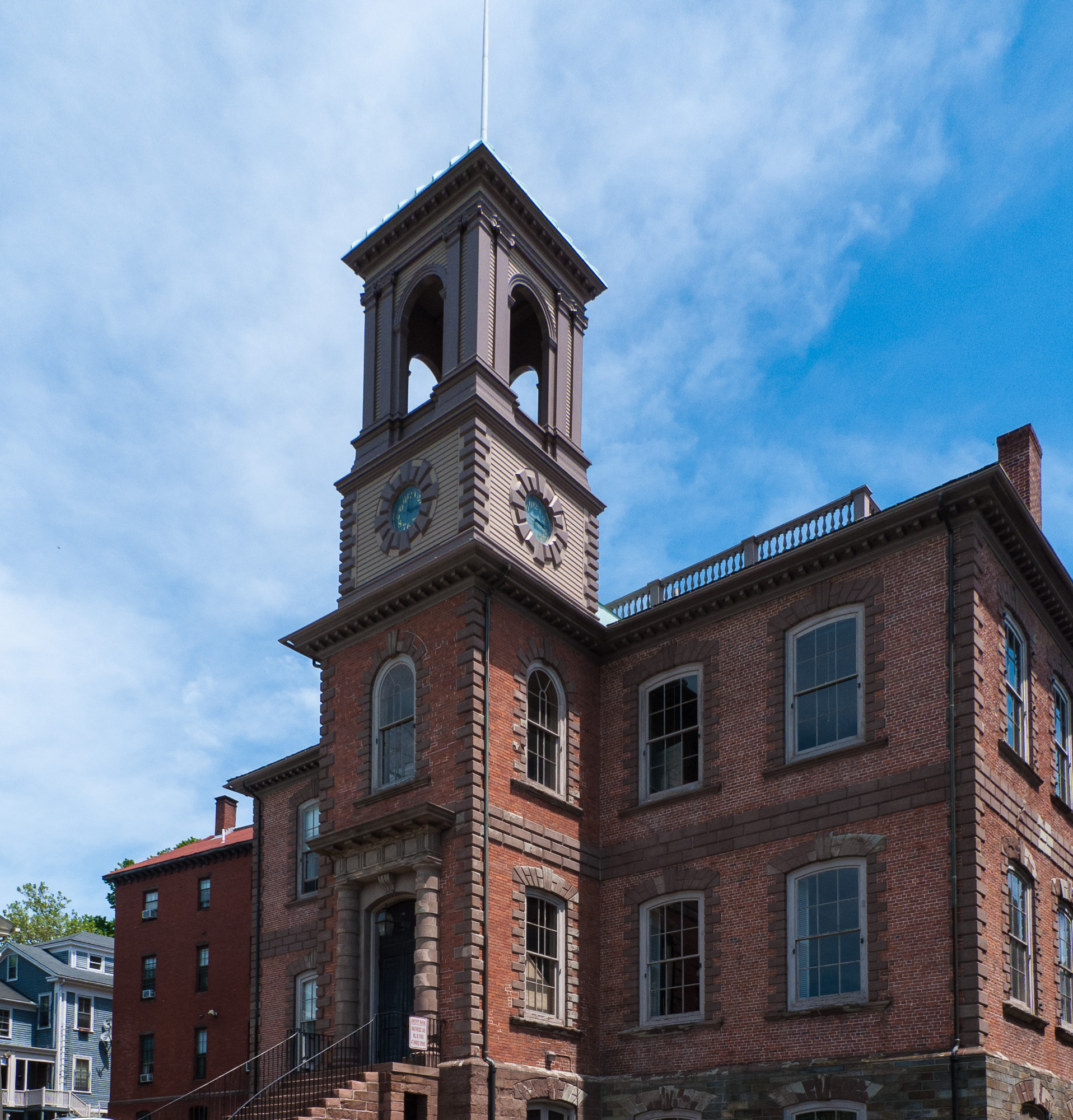
The building in 2012

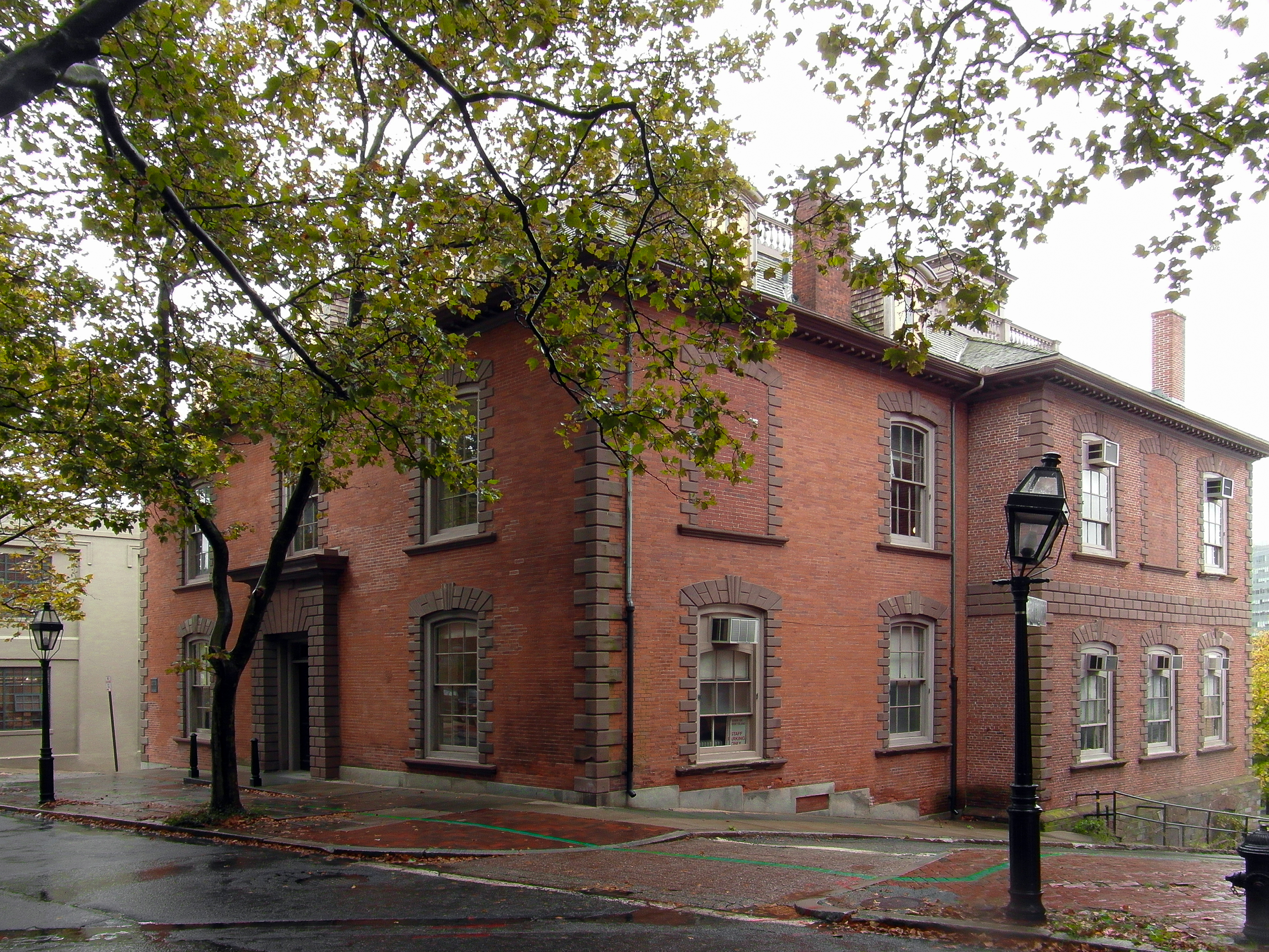
The Benefit Street facade of the building

== See also ==
- National Register of Historic Places listings in Providence, Rhode Island
