= Rhode Island State House =

State capitol of Rhode Island, US

- U.S. National Register of Historic Places
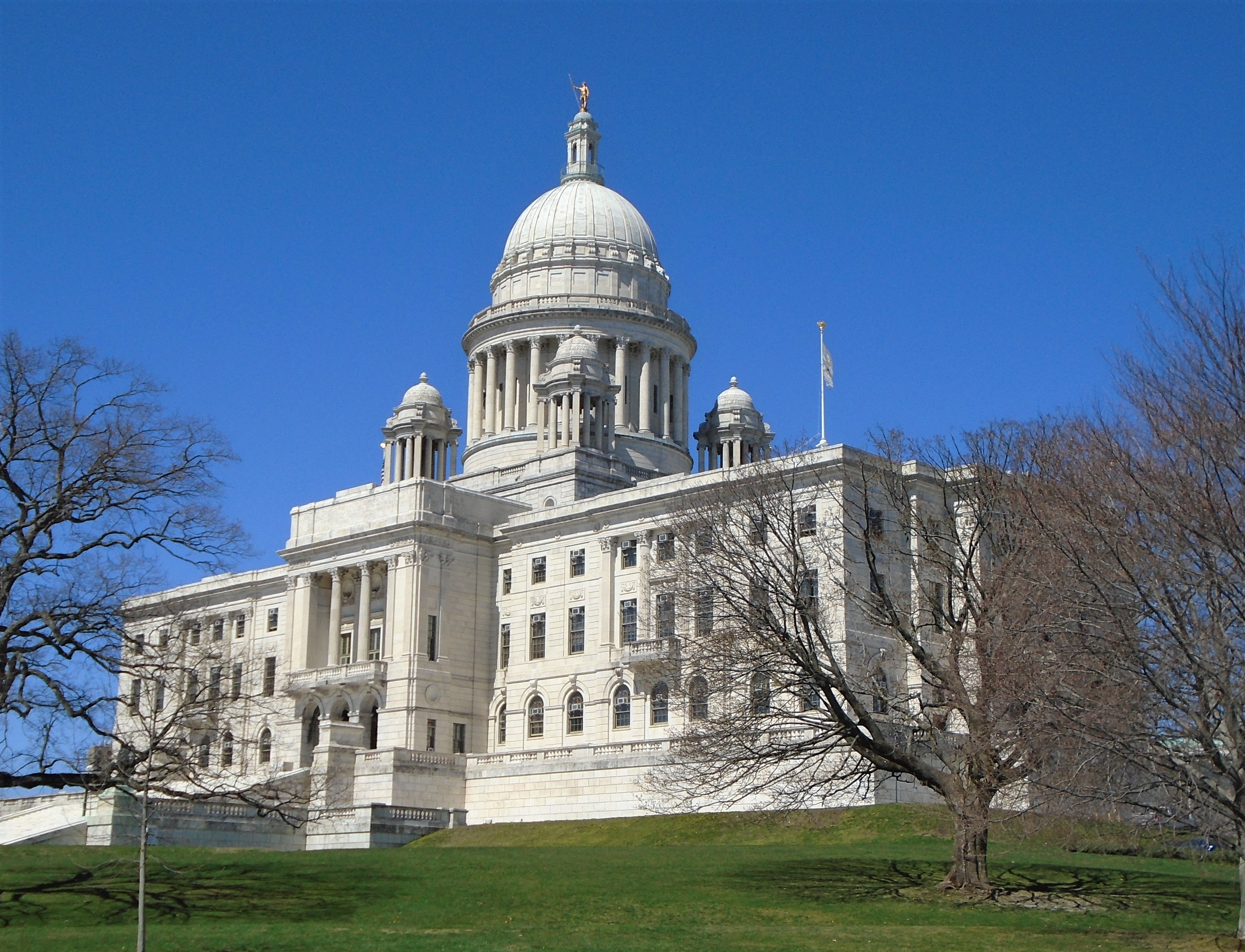
- South facade
- Interactive map showing Rhode Island State Capitol's location
- Location: 82 Smith St. Providence, Rhode Island
- Coordinates: 41°49′51″N 71°24′54″W
- Area: Downtown and Smith Hill
- Built: 1901; 125 years ago
- Architect: McKim, Mead & White
- Architectural style: Neoclassical
- NRHP reference No.: 70000002
- Added to NRHP: April 28, 1970

The Rhode Island State House, the capitol of the U.S. state of Rhode Island, is located at 82 Smith Street just below the crest of Smith Hill, on the border of downtown in Providence. It is a neoclassical building designed by McKim, Mead & White which features the fourth largest structural-stone dome in the world, topped by a gilded statue of The Independent Man, representing freedom and independence. The building houses the Rhode Island General Assembly – the state House of Representatives is located in the west wing, and the Senate in the east – and the offices of the governor, lieutenant governor, secretary of state, and general treasurer of Rhode Island. Other state offices are located in separate buildings on a campus just north of the State House.

The structure was added to the National Register of Historic Places in 1970.

== History ==
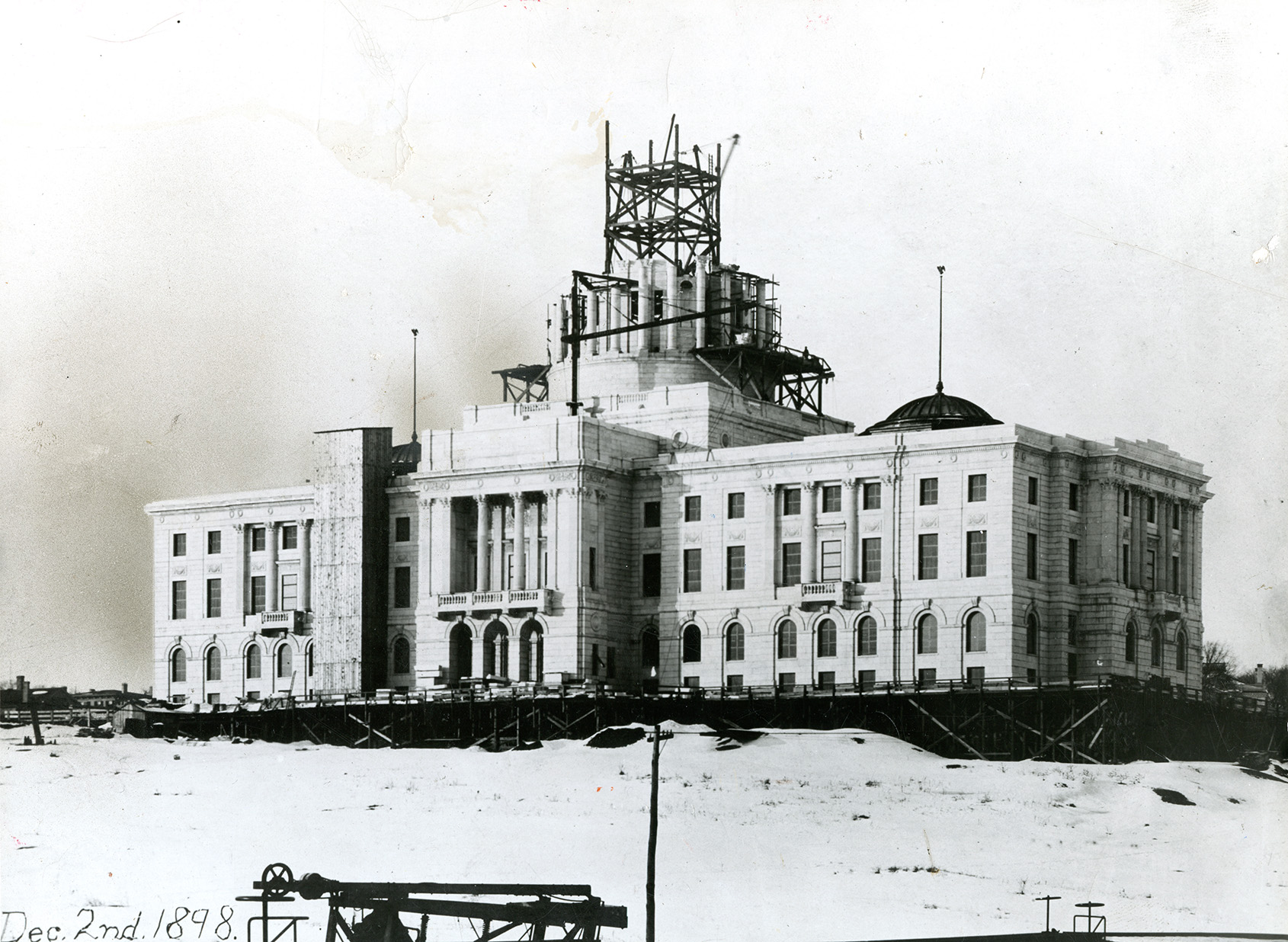
The building under construction (1898)

The current Rhode Island State House is Rhode Island's seventh state house and the second in Providence after the Old State House. The structure was designed by McKim, Mead & White, a prominent firm from New York. The building was constructed from 1891 to 1901. The structure underwent a major renovation in the late 1990s.

A private organization, the State House Restoration Society, raises funds and advocates for the landmark building.

== Architecture ==
The Rhode Island State House is constructed of 327,000 cubic feet (9,300 m^{3}) of white Georgia marble, 15 million bricks, and 1,309 short tons (1,169 long tons) of iron floor beams. The dome is "the fourth largest self-supported marble dome in the world".

The chamber of the Rhode Island Senate is located in the east wing of the building, and the chamber of the Rhode Island House of Representatives is located in the west wing. Other notable rooms include the rotunda (beneath the dome), the State Library (north end), and the State Room (south end). The State Room is an entrance area for the office of the governor and contains a full-scale portrait of George Washington by Rhode Island native Gilbert Stuart. This room is also where the governor has press conferences and bill signings at the State House.

The State House was one of the first public buildings to use electricity. It is currently lit by 109 floodlights and two searchlights at night.

== The Independent Man (1899) ==
The Independent Man

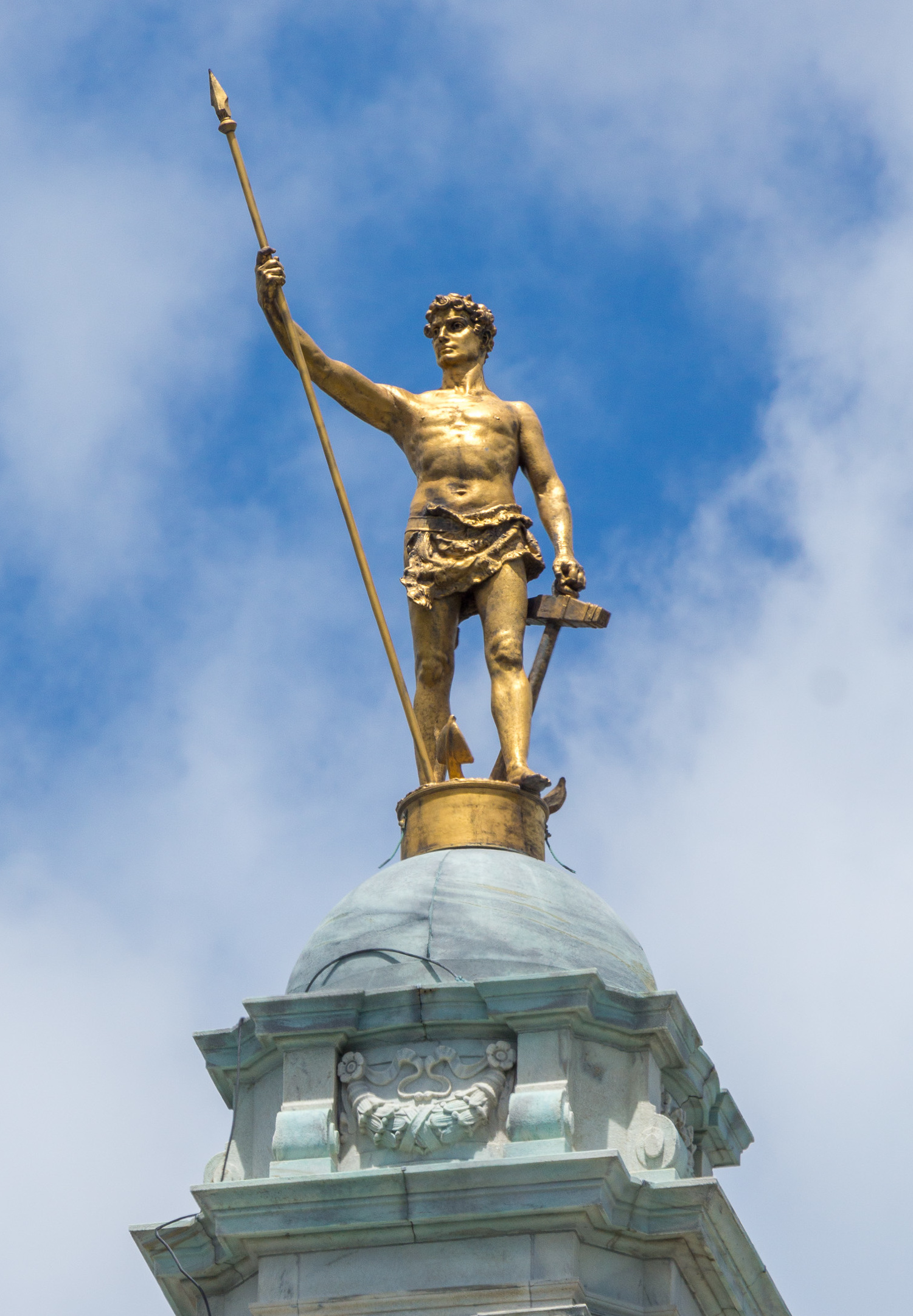
Perched atop the State House

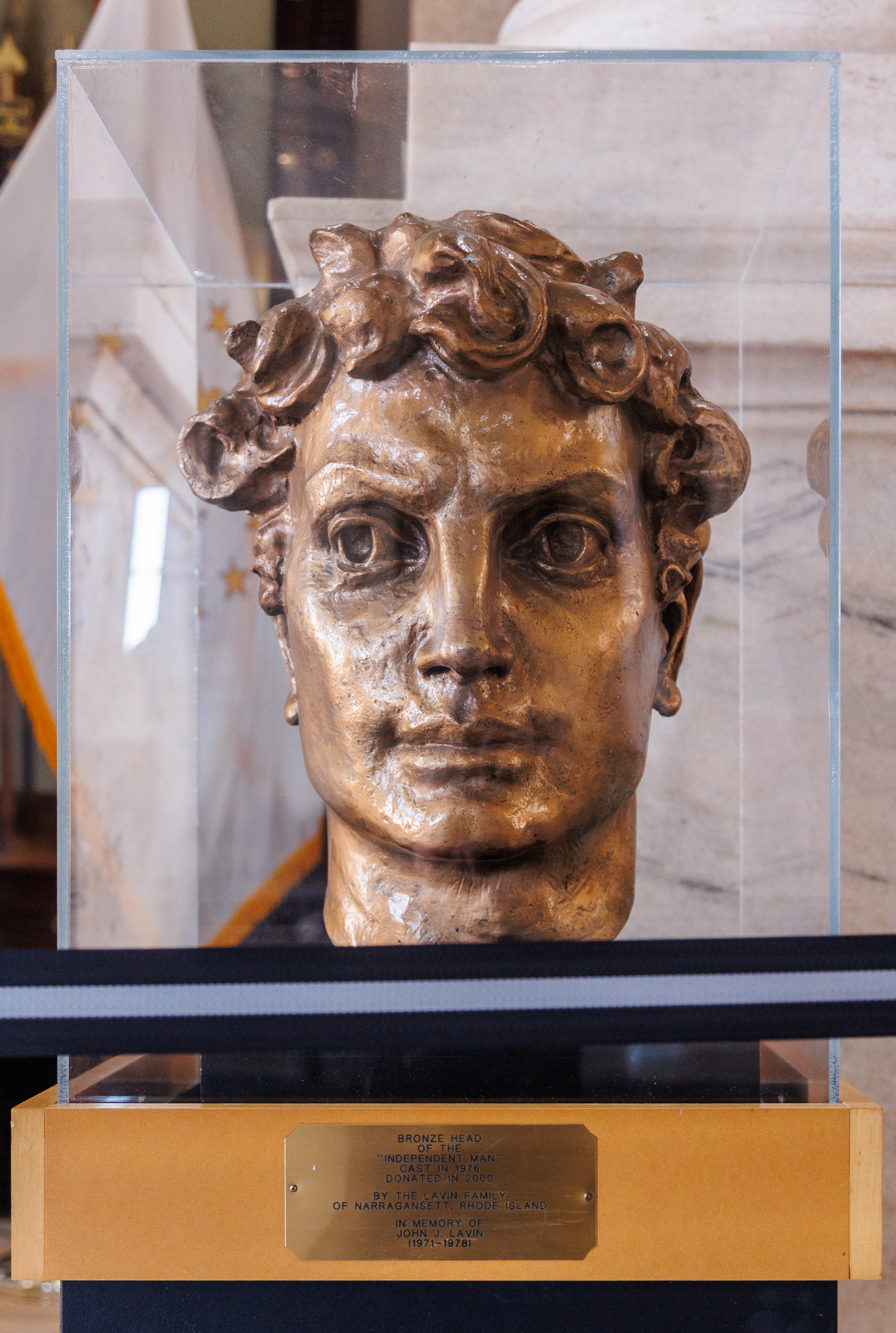
Cast of the head made in 1976

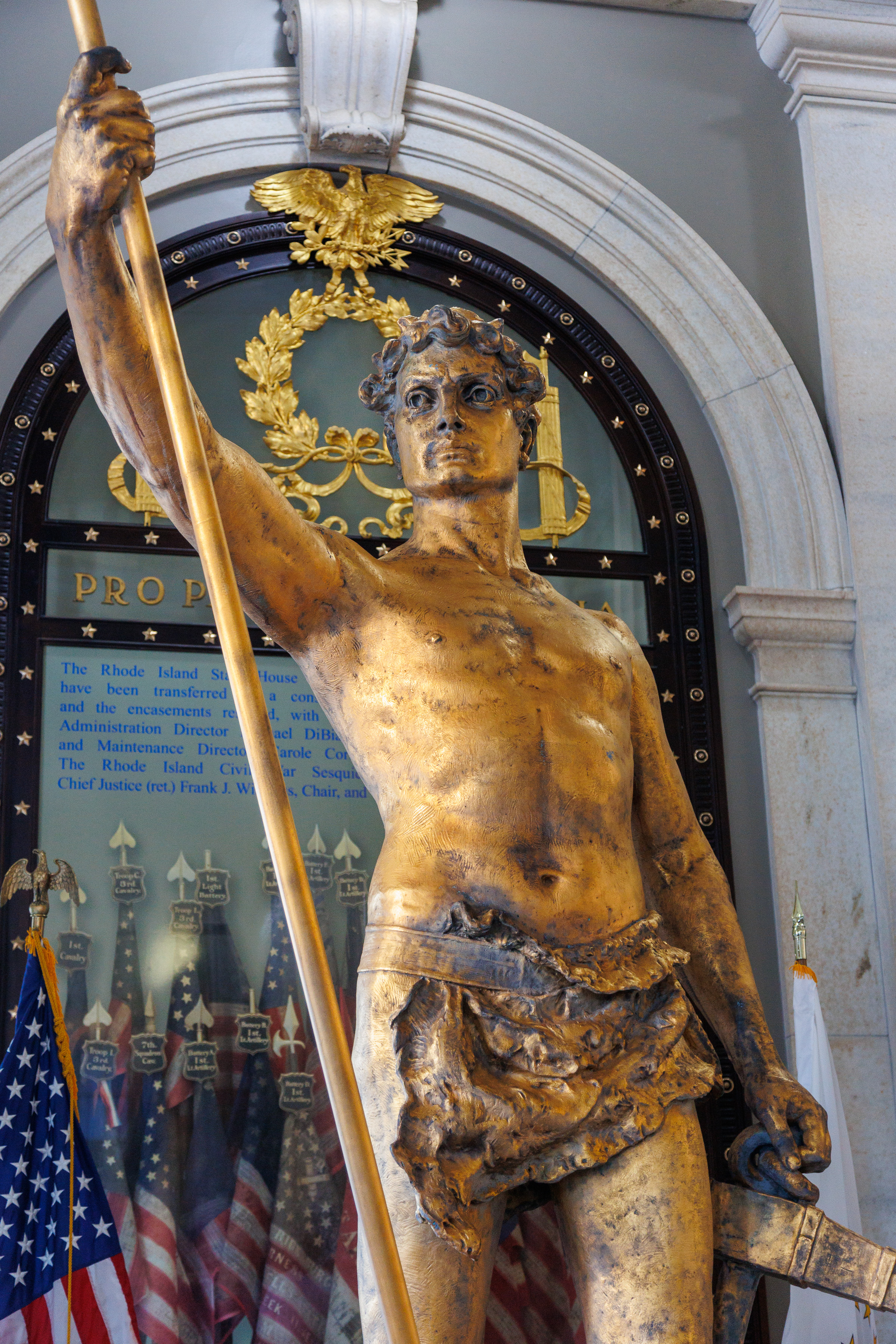
Before 2024 restoration

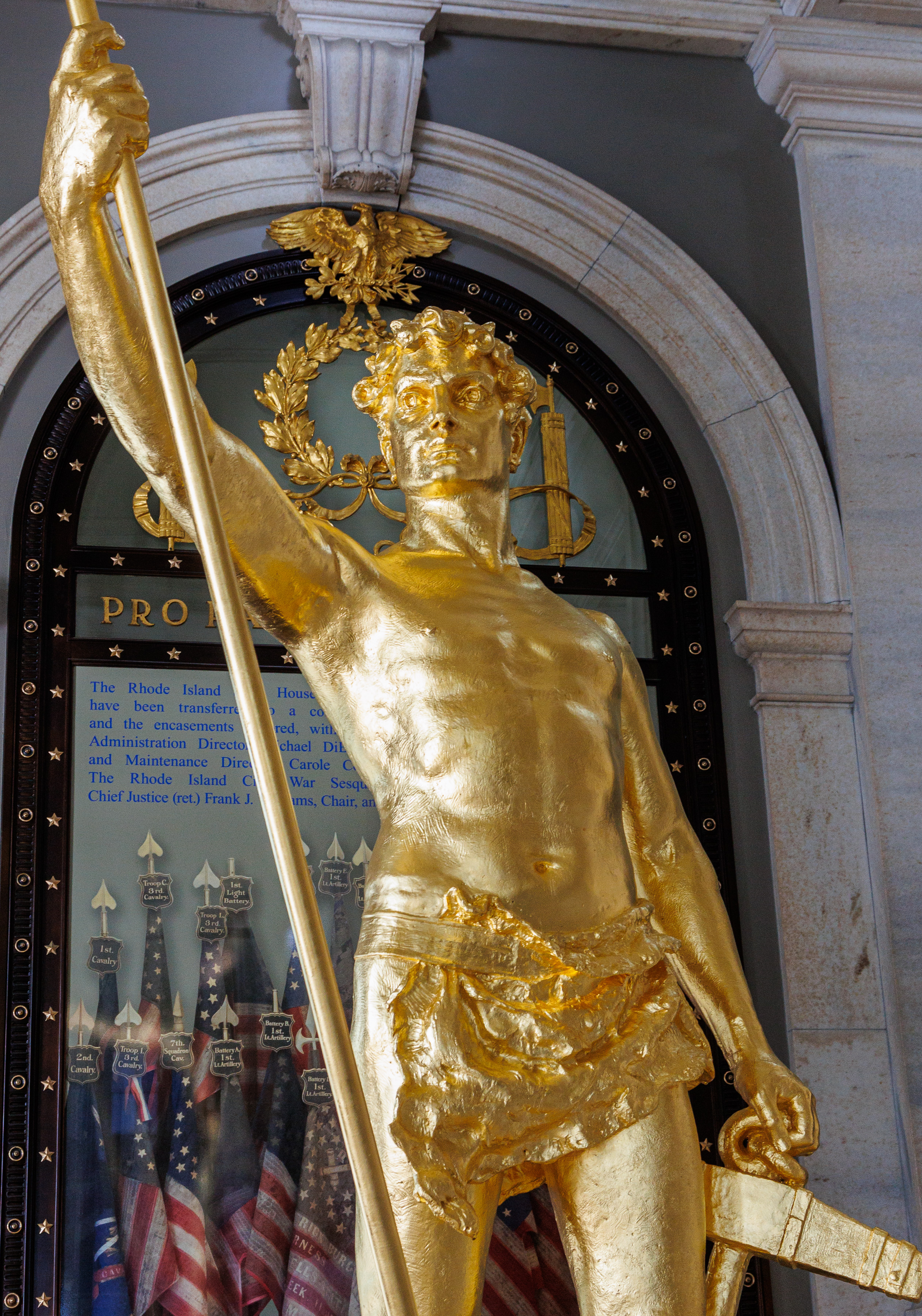
After restoration

On top of the dome stands a gold-covered bronze statue of a male figure known as The Independent Man. The statue, originally named Hope, was designed by George Brewster, cast by the Gorham Manufacturing Company, and installed in 1899. The statue weighs more than 500 pounds (230 kg), is 11 feet (3.4 m) tall, and stands 278 feet (85 m) above the ground. The Independent Man represents freedom and independence and alludes to the independent spirit which led Roger Williams to settle and establish Providence Plantations and later the Colony of Rhode Island and Providence Plantations.

In 1976, the statue was removed from its perch for restoration and repair. Workers cast a full-size replica, which was installed at the Warwick Mall, as well as two replicas of the statue's head, before returning the original to its home atop the State House.

A 2023 drone inspection revealed damage to the statue's marble base. In December 2023 the statue was lowered to the ground via crane so that the base could be repaired. The statue was briefly displayed inside the State House for public viewing, then was moved to the North Main Street armory for repair and restoration.

=== Materials ===
The statue is cast in bronze, and was originally covered in gold leaf. During the 1970s restoration the statue was covered in gold plating instead of gold leaf. Restorers planned to apply gold leaf on top of the existing gold plating during the 2023–2024 restoration. As the gold leaf will wear over time, the gold plating will be visible.

== Events and exhibits ==
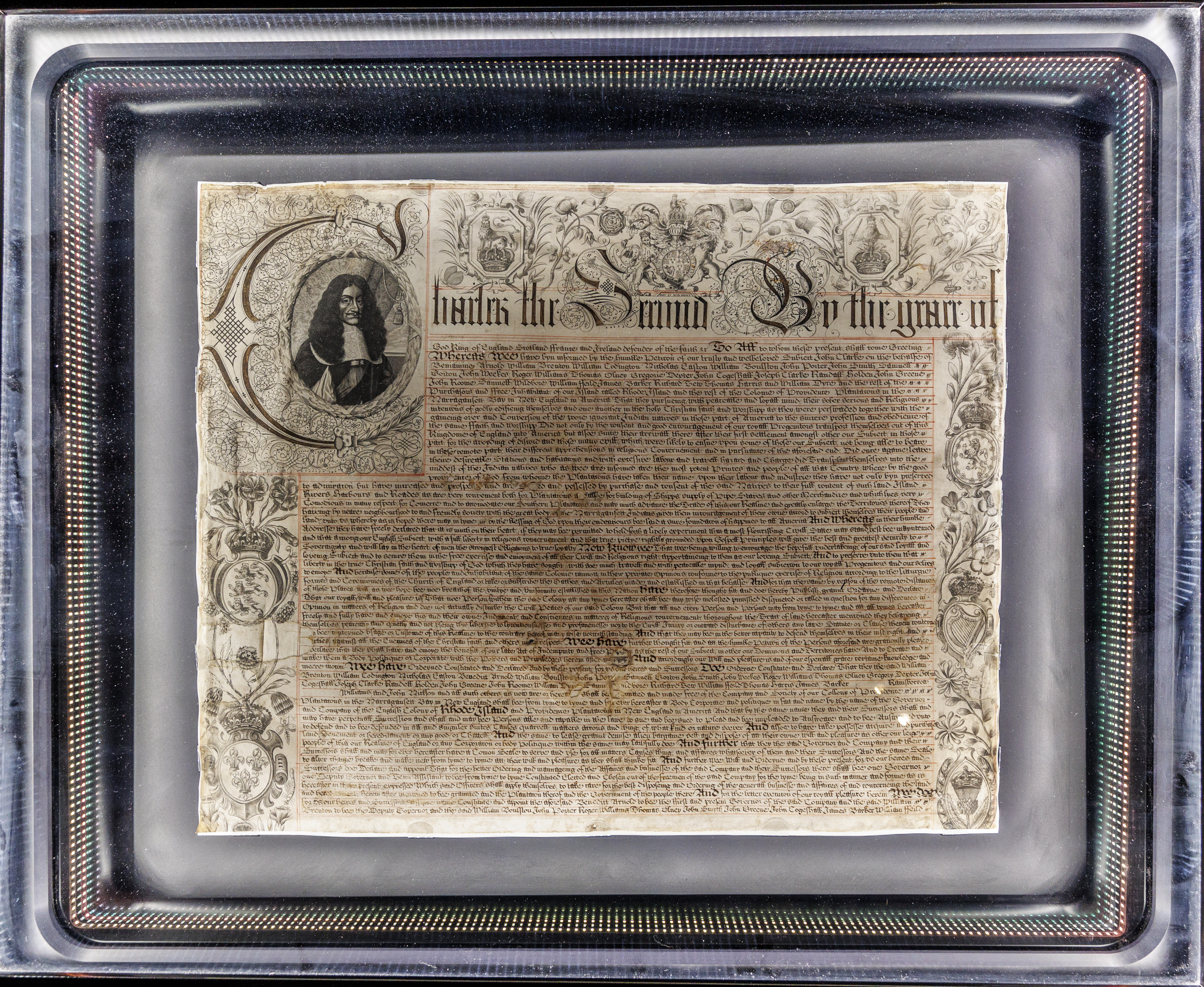
Top part of the Rhode Island Charter in the State House

=== Royal Charter ===
The original Rhode Island Royal Charter of 1663 is on permanent display in a small museum at the State House. The exhibit was redesigned and rededicated in January 2016.

=== Gettysburg Gun ===
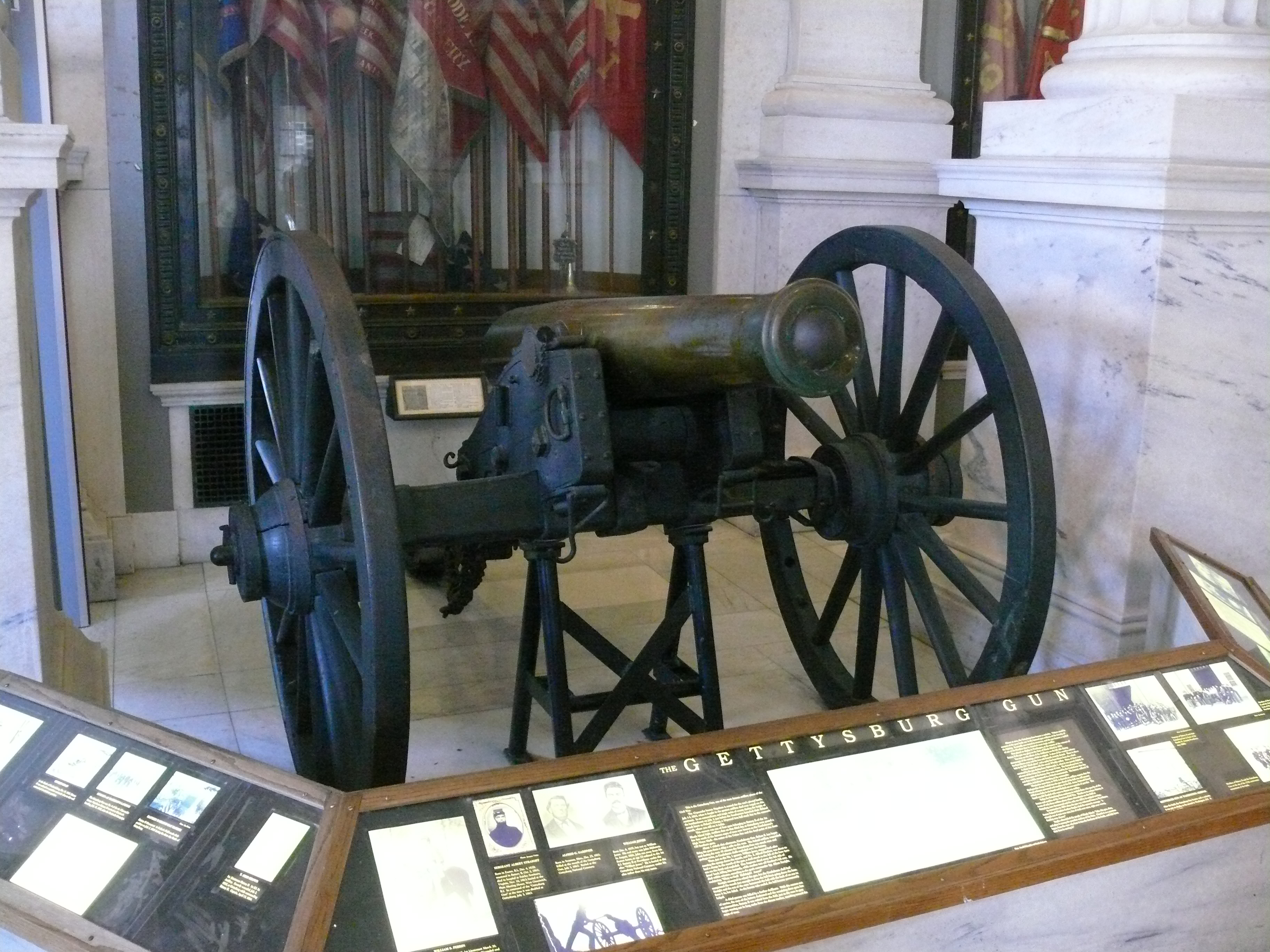
The Gettysburg Gun

A 12-pound bronze Civil War–era Napoleon cannon known as The Gettysburg Gun stands just inside the first floor entrance. During the artillery barrage before Pickett's Charge, a Confederate cannonball lodged itself in the muzzle of the gun used by Battery B, 1st Rhode Island Light Artillery Regiment, putting it out of service. The gun was first displayed in Washington, D.C.; in 1874, Rhode Islanders requested that it be brought home, where it was installed at the State House. In 1988, to commemorate the 125th anniversary of the battle, the gun was temporarily returned to the exact spot in Gettysburg National Military Park where it had been disabled.

=== Christmas at the State House ===
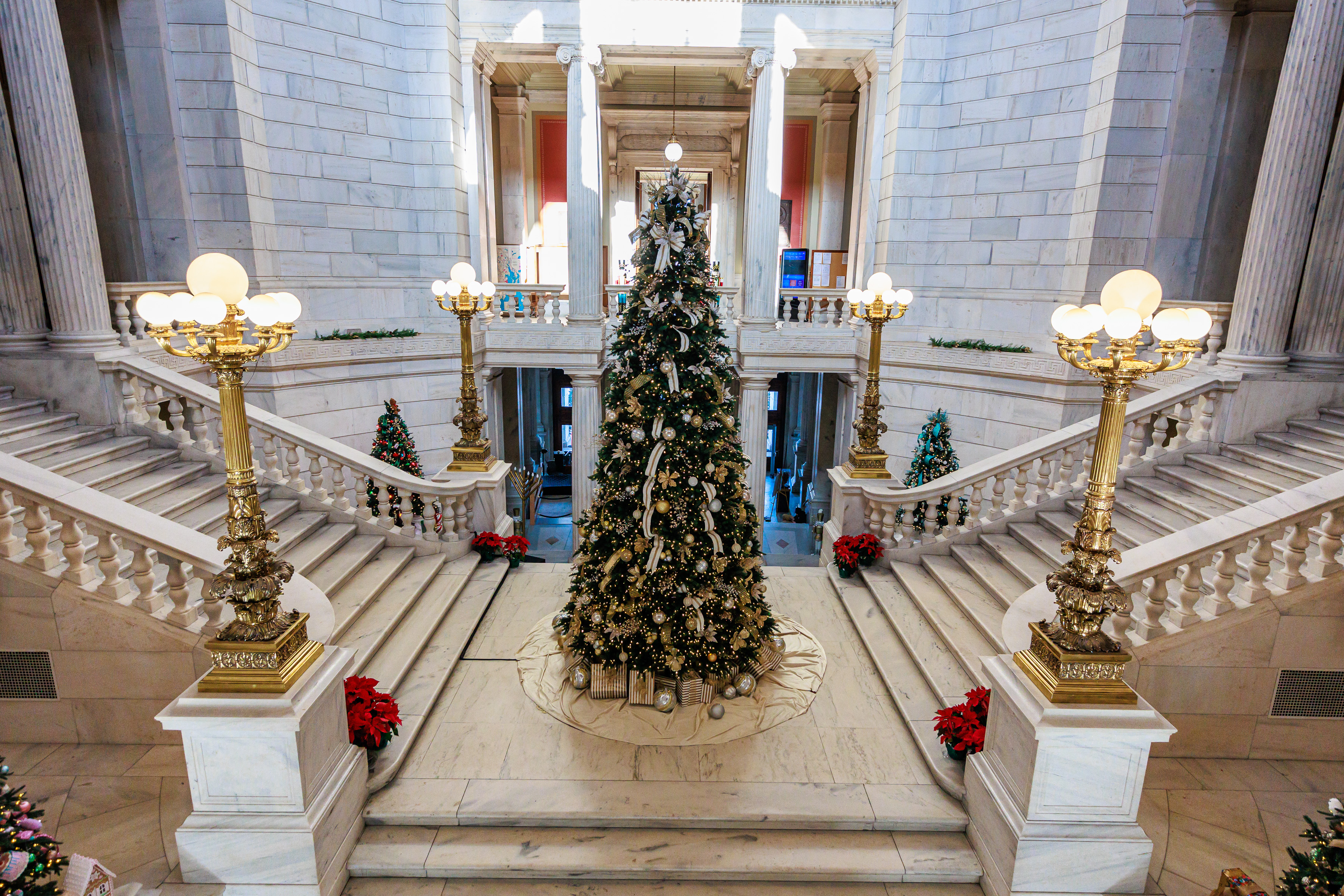
2024 tree

It is an annual State House tradition to feature a Christmas tree and community and cultural holiday displays each December. A Fraser fir or balsam fir is erected in the rotunda and decorated. The tree, donated by a local family or tree farm, is typically between 17 and 25 feet tall. Local media will sometimes feature stories about problems with Rhode Island's state tree, occasionally even meriting front page treatment:

- In 2005, the tree was removed from the rotunda after a treatment with flame retardant caused the needles to fall out.
- In 2007, a "sickly-looking" tree was replaced a few weeks before Christmas.
- In 2011 Bishop Thomas J. Tobin and others objected to the wording on tree-lighting ceremony invitations, which referred to the tree as a "holiday" tree. Protestors at the tree-lighting ceremony lit a protest tree of their own and sang "O, Christmas Tree," drowning out the official music provided by a local children's chorus.
- In 2012, the official tree lighting ceremony was canceled.
- In 2013, Governor Chafee called the state's 17-foot spruce a "Christmas" tree.
- In 2016, a 14-foot Fraser fir was deemed too small for the rotunda. A replacement 20-foot tree was placed in the rotunda, and the smaller tree moved to the south steps.
- In 2017, the rotunda's 25-foot Fraser fir made national headlines when it began dropping needles "at an alarming rate," after being on display for three weeks. The New York Post called it "the saddest state capital Christmas tree." The sickly tree was replaced with a smaller (12-foot) tree.
- The 2018 tree was an 18-foot tall Douglas fir donated by a South Kingstown tree farm.
- For 2019, state staff assembled and decorated 18-foot artificial tree, described as a "replica of a California Baby Redwood."
- After protests disrupted the official tree lighting ceremonies in 2021 and 2022, Governor Dan McKee decided to hold the 2023, 2024, and 2025 celebrations privately, inviting only foster children and their families from the Department of Children, Youth and Families.

Since 2014, holiday displays from "any Rhode Island area-based religious or secular group" have been featured on the first and second floors. Participating groups have included local religious, ethnic, and secular organizations.

== In popular culture ==
The building served as the United States Capitol exterior in the 1997 film Amistad and the City Hall of Capital City in Disney's Underdog.

== Gallery ==
South facade (2026)

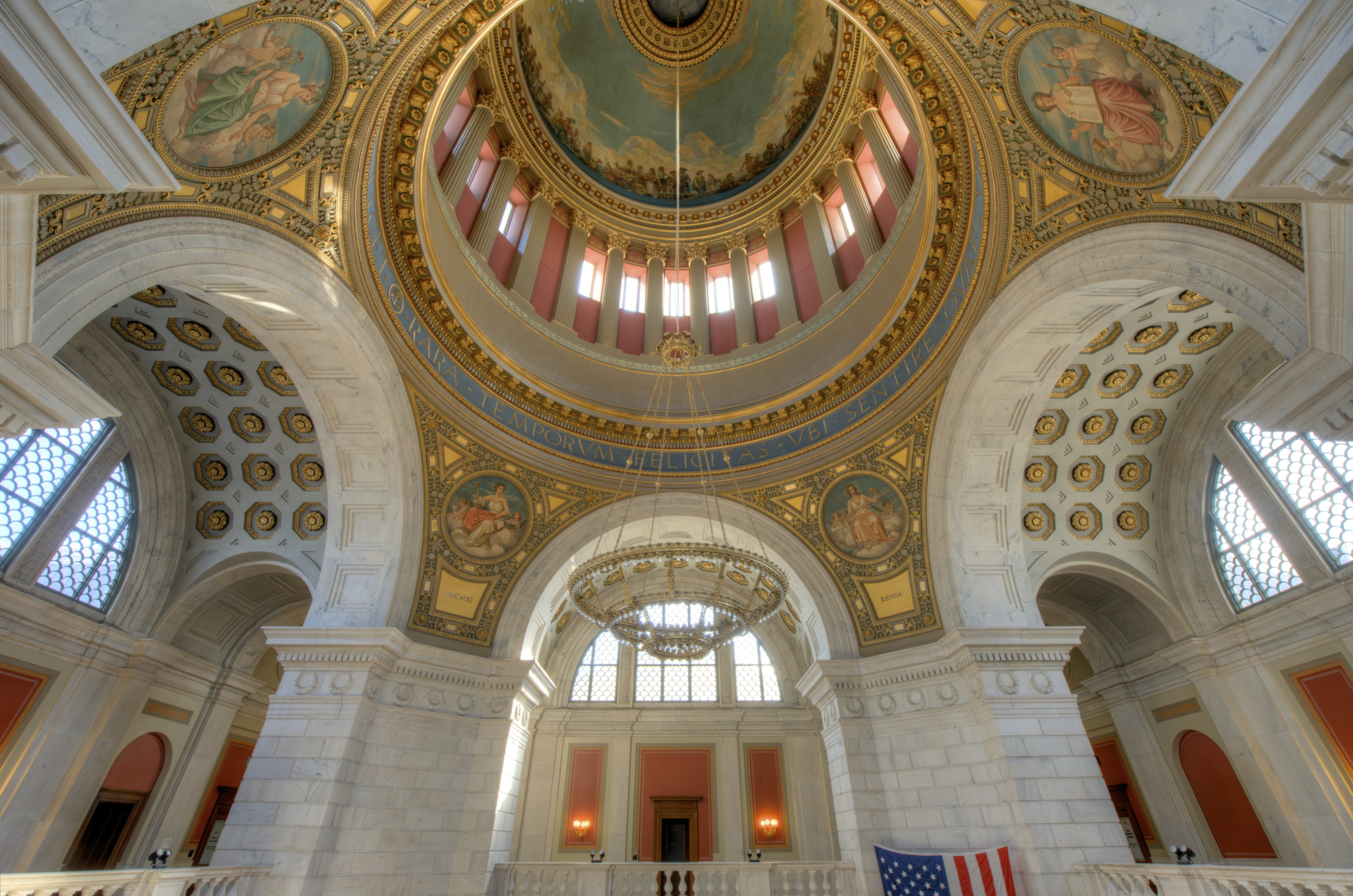
Rotunda ceiling, under the dome

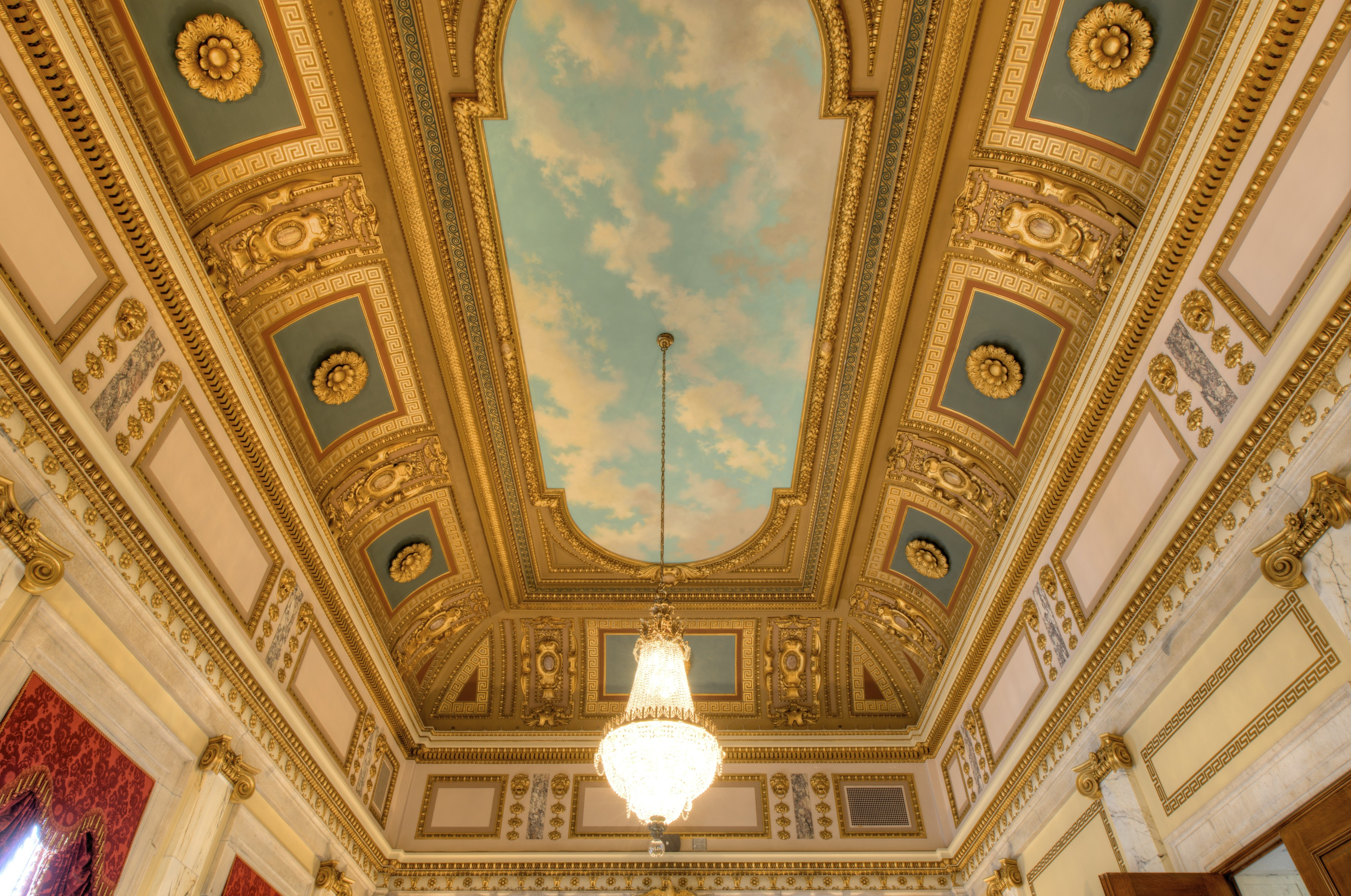
State Room ceiling

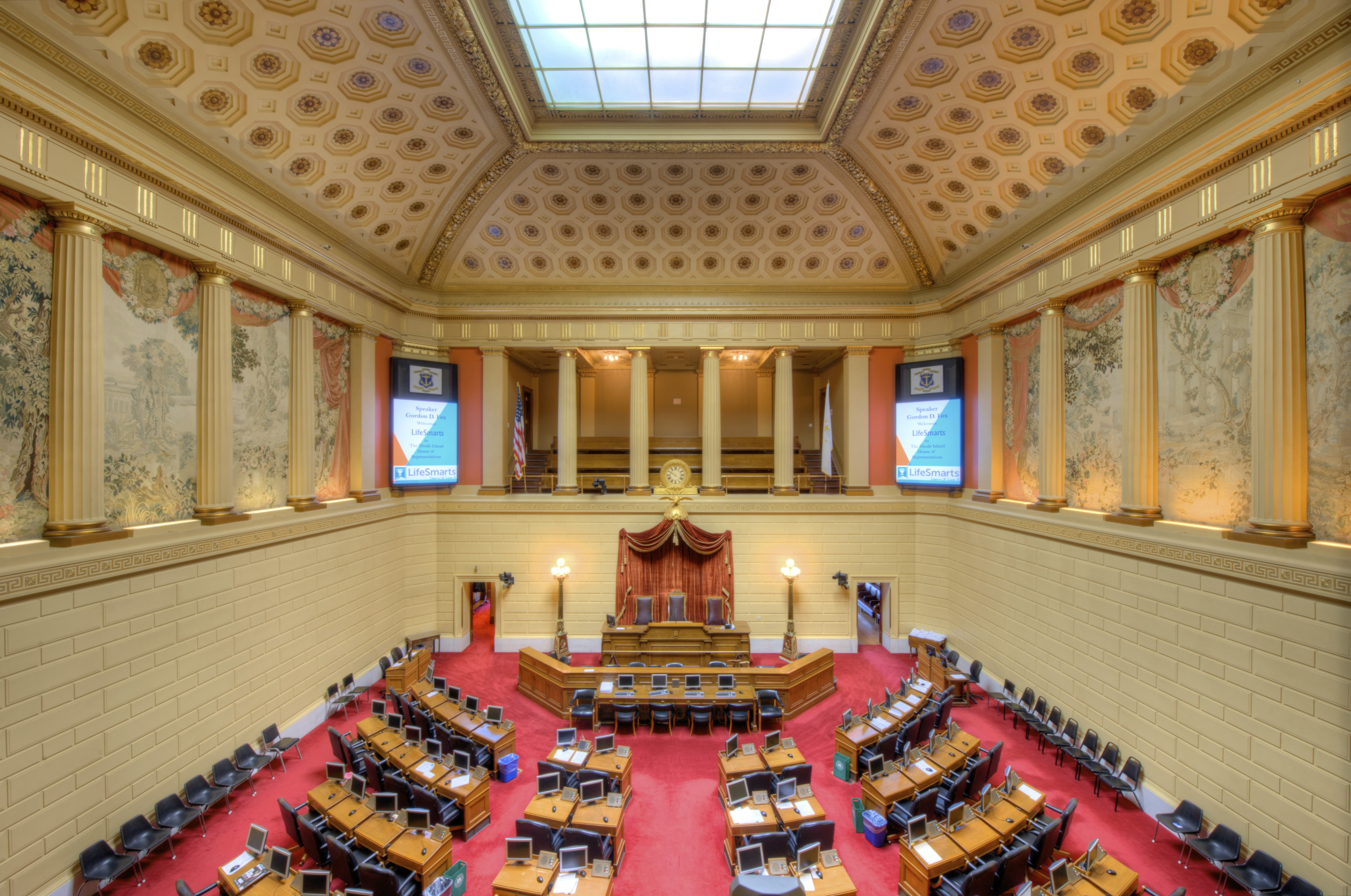
House chamber

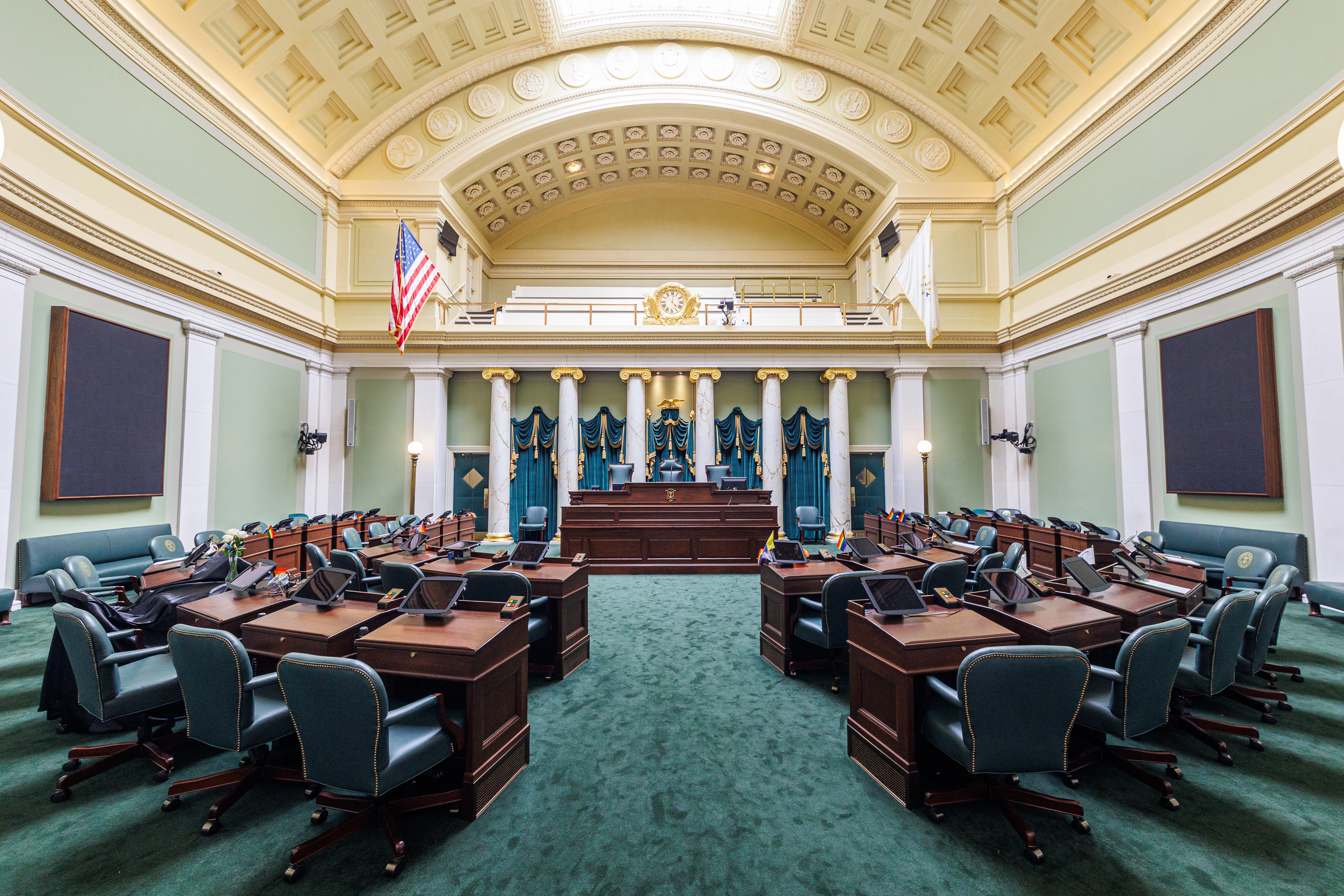
Senate chamber

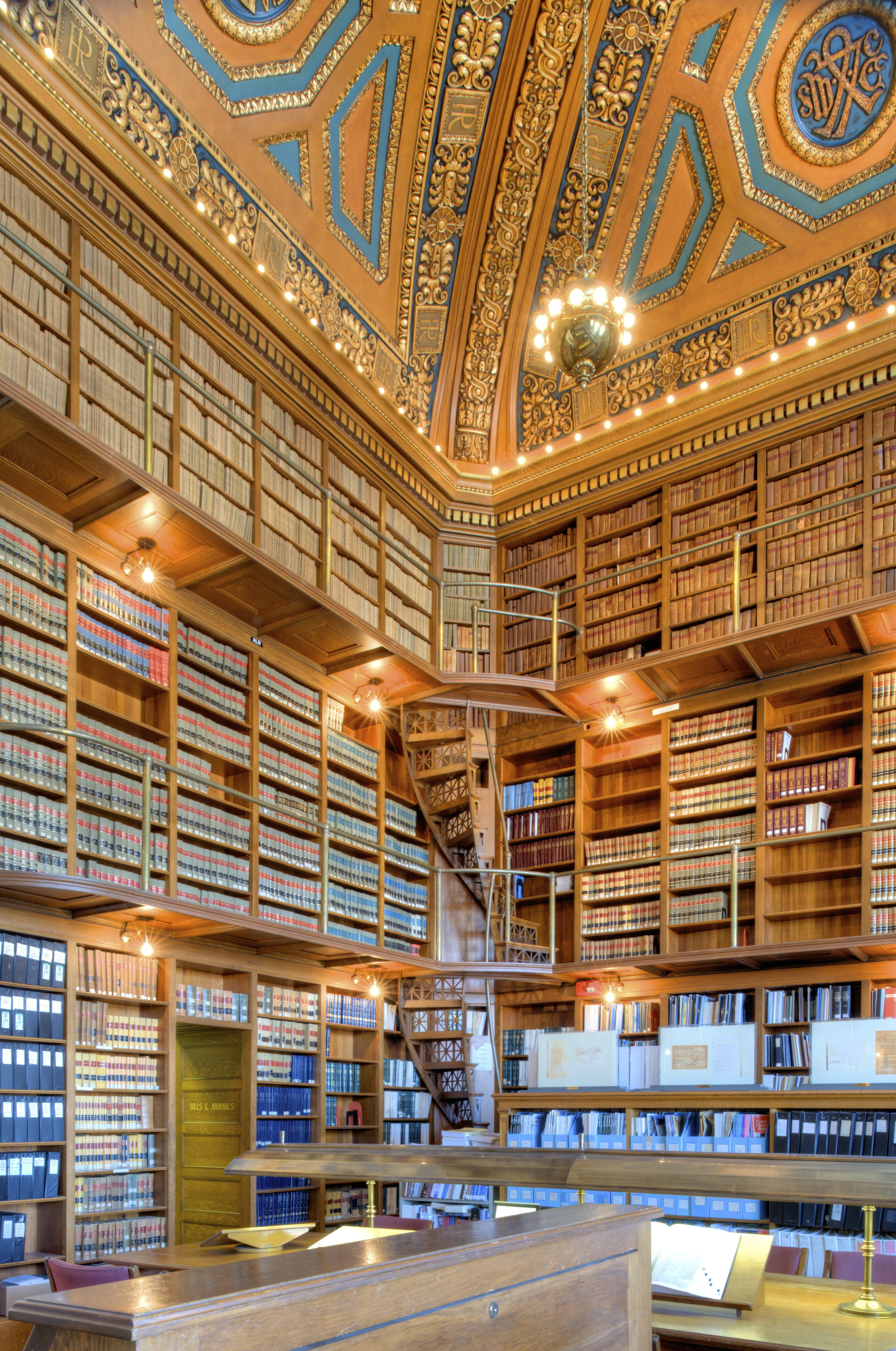
Rhode Island State Library

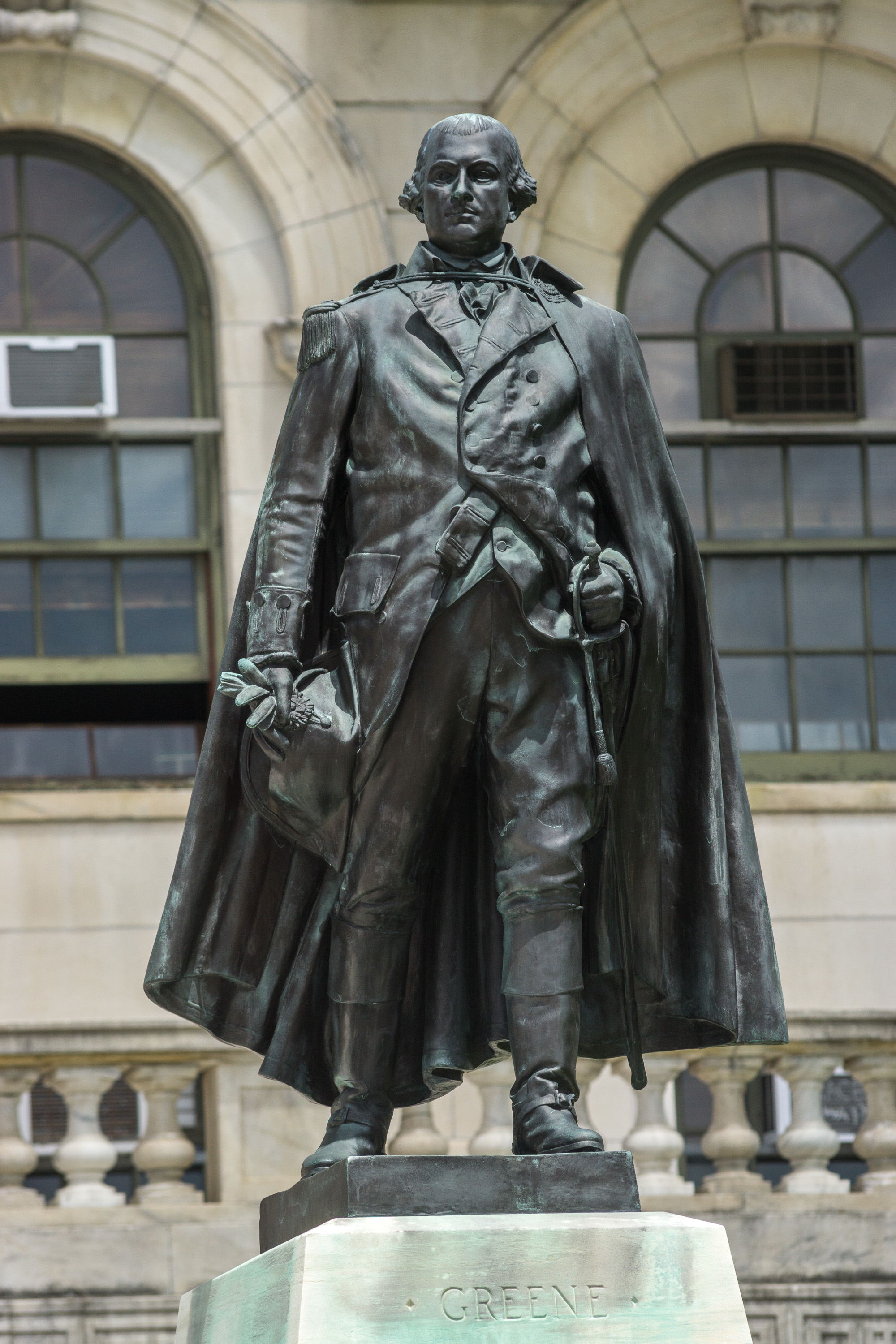
Statue of Nathanael Greene by Henri Schönhardt (1931)

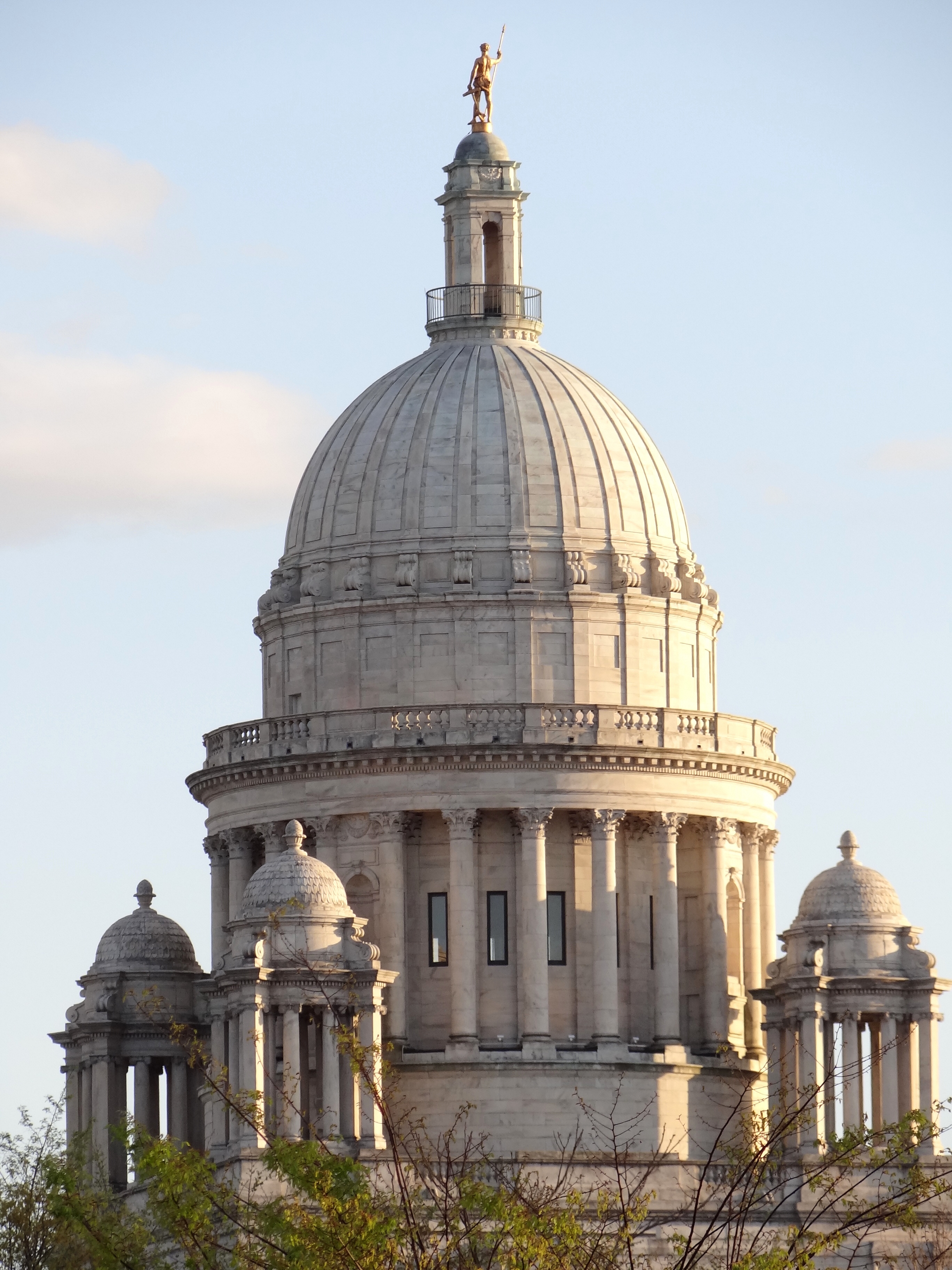
The state house dome, the 4th largest structural stone dome in the world

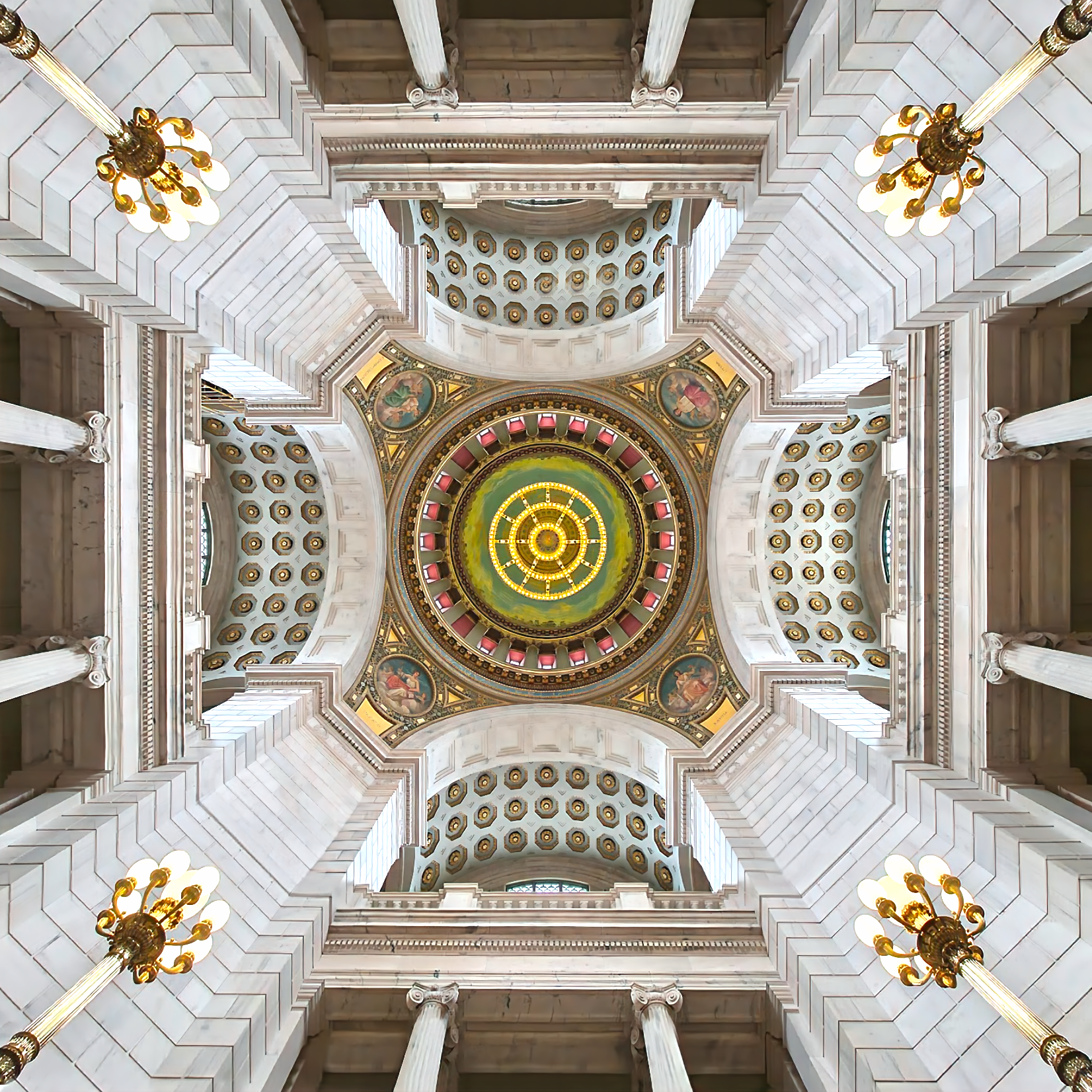
Rotunda

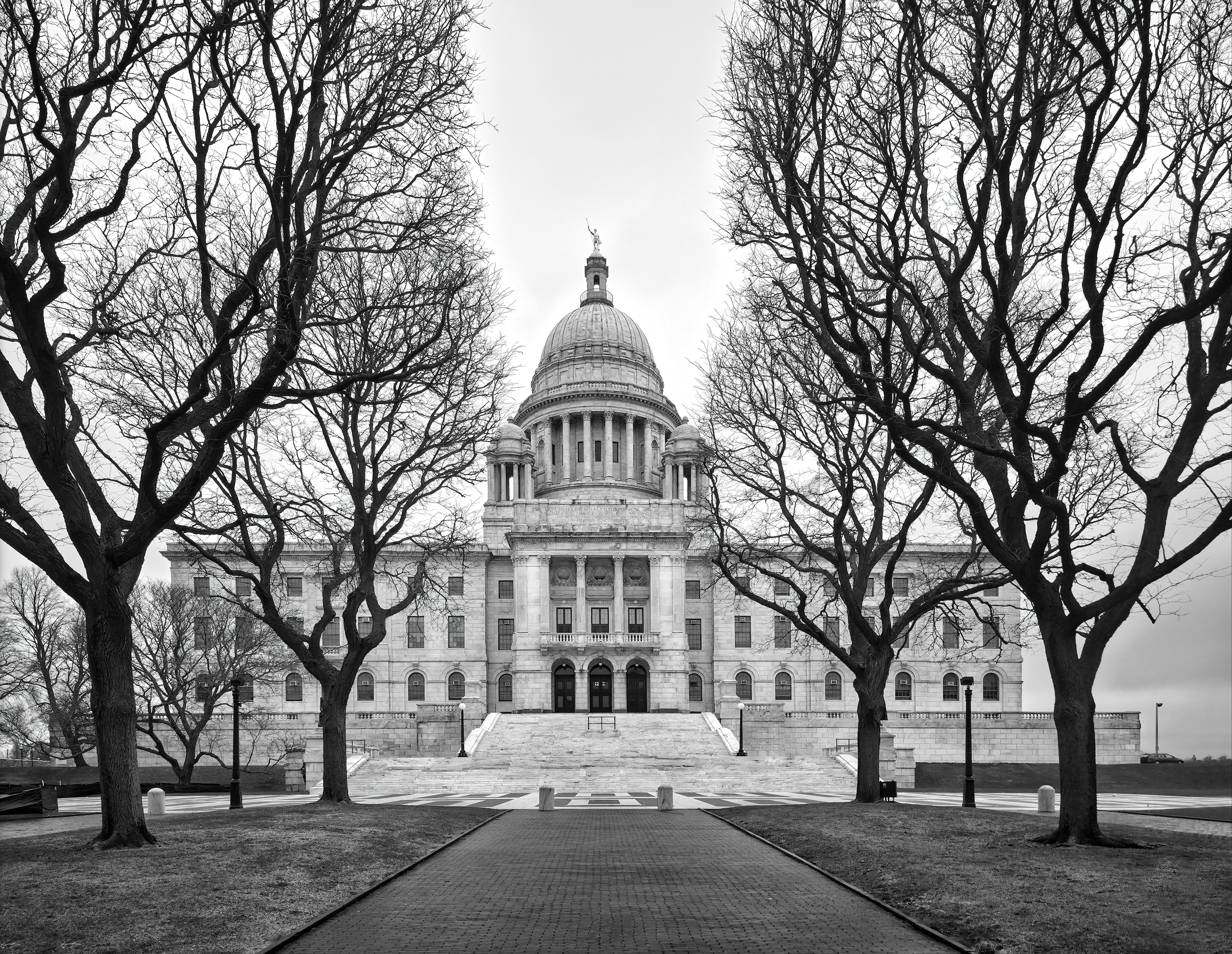
South Facade

== See also ==
- List of Rhode Island state legislatures
- National Register of Historic Places listings in Providence, Rhode Island
- List of state and territorial capitols in the United States
- List of tallest buildings in Providence, Rhode Island

Preceded by Unknown	Tallest building in Providence; 1904–1927; 68 m	Succeeded by Industrial Trust Building
