= Temple Beth-El (Providence, Rhode Island) =

Synagogue in Providence, Rhode Island

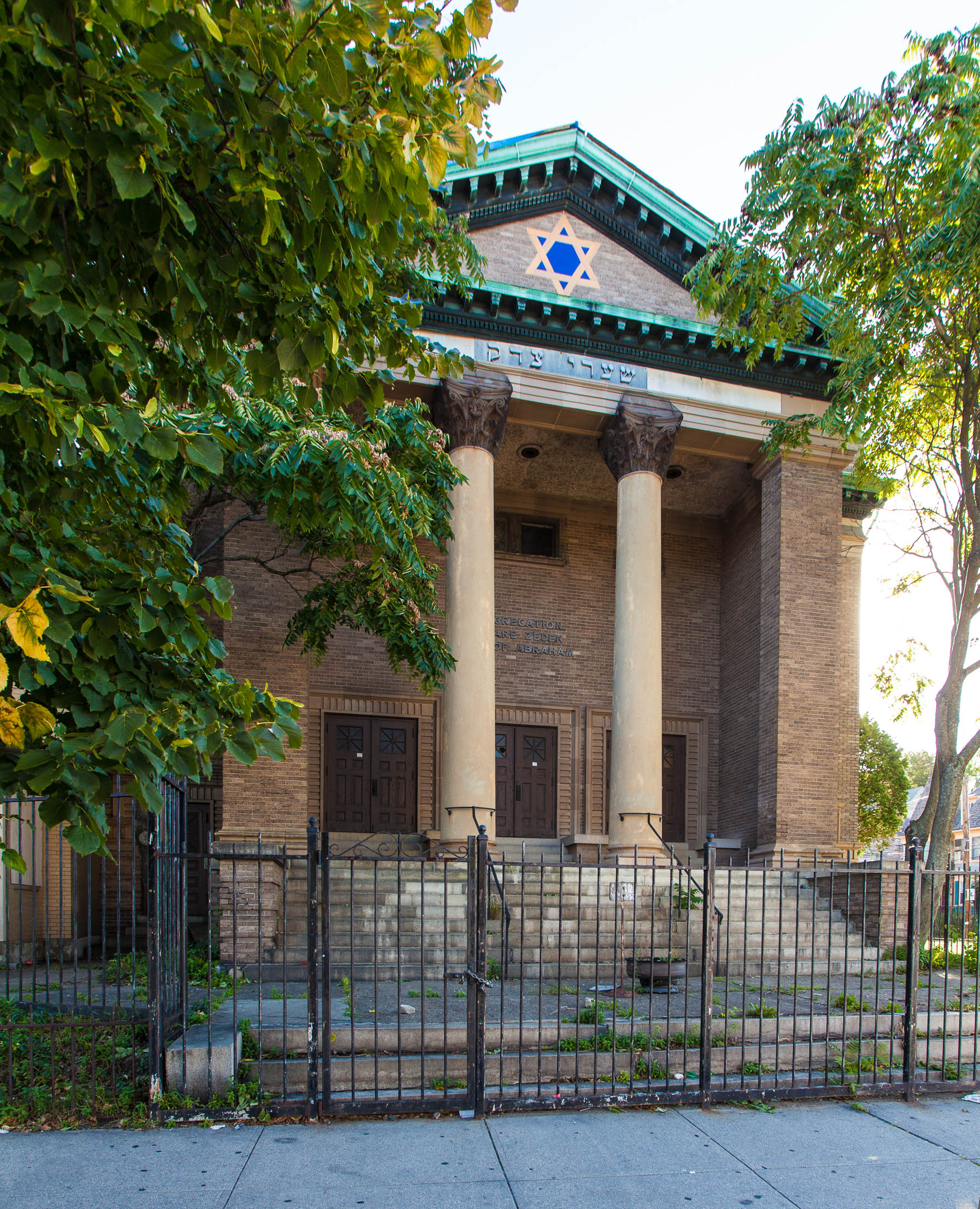

- Location in Rhode Island

Religion
- Affiliation: Reform Judaism
- Ecclesiastical or organizational status: Synagogue

Location
- Location: 70 Orchard Avenue, Providence, Rhode Island 02906
- Country: United States
- Interactive map of Temple Beth-El
- Coordinates: 41°49′56″N 71°23′06″W

Architecture
- Architect: Percival Goodman
- Type: Synagogue
- Established: 1854 (as a congregation)
- Completed: 1890 (downtown Providence); 1911 (Broad Street); 1954 (Orchard Avenue)

Website
- temple-beth-el.org
- Temple Beth-El
- U.S. National Register of Historic Places
- Broad Street Synagogue
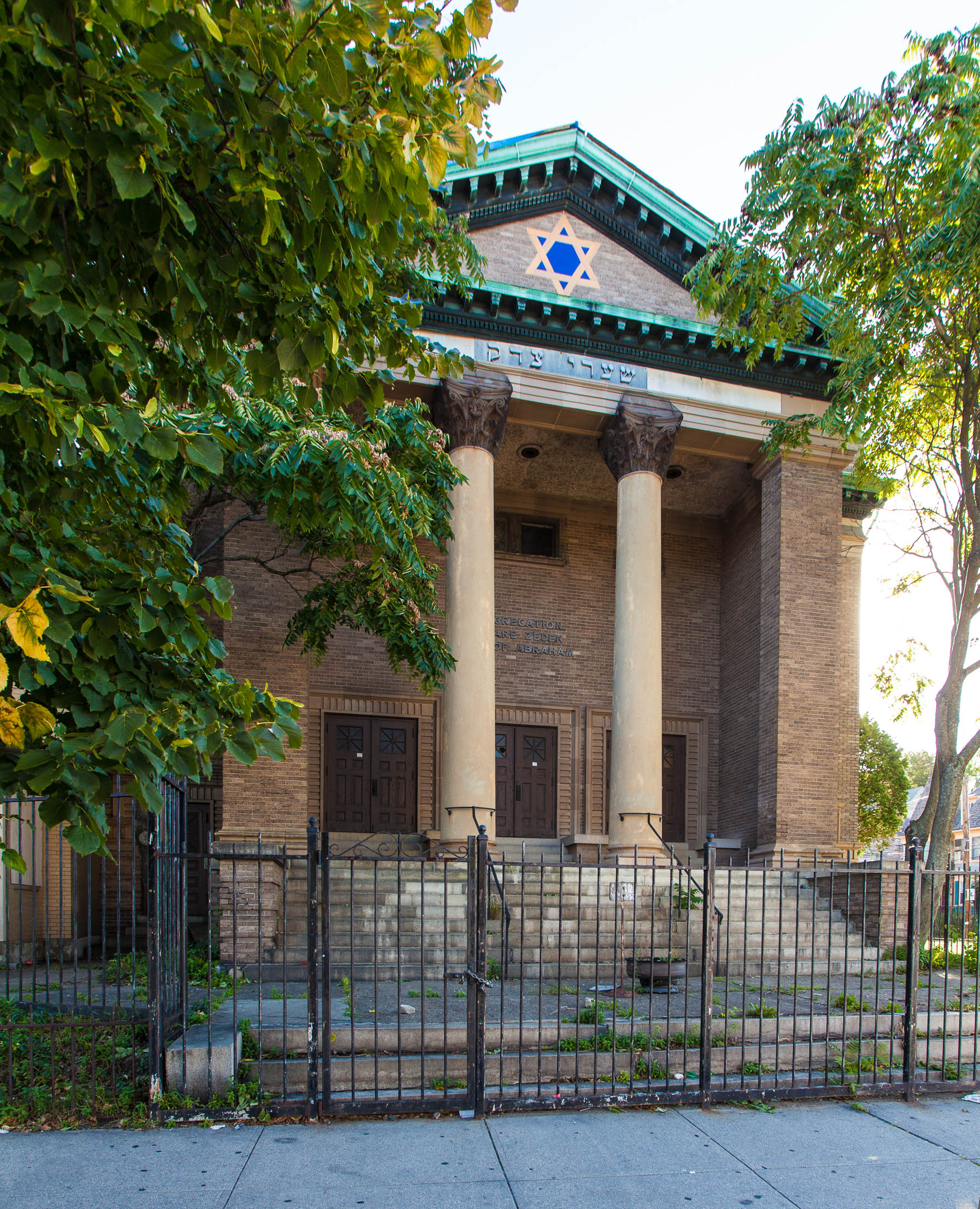
- The former Temple Beth-El (Broad Street) synagogue in 2012
- Location: 688 Broad Street, Providence, Rhode Island
- Coordinates: 41°48′19″N 71°25′11″W
- Built: 1910
- Architect: Banning & Thornton
- Architectural style: Classical Revival
- NRHP reference No.: 88003074
- Added to NRHP: December 29, 1988

Temple Beth-El, officially known as the Congregation Sons of Israel and David, Temple Beth-El, is a Reform] Jewish synagogue at 70 Orchard Avenue in Providence, Rhode Island, United States.

Formerly known as the Broad Street Synagogue, the historic synagogue was located at 688 Broad Street from 1911 until 1954, in a building that was added to the National Register of Historic Places in 1988.

== History ==
The congregation was founded in 1849 when an Orthodox group known as the "Sons of Israel" gathered for daily services in Providence. In 1877, the congregation affiliated itself with the Union of American Hebrew Congregations (later becoming the Union for Reform Judaism), the national Reform denomination. While Newport had a well-established Sephardi Jewish community since the 17th century, few Sephardi Jews lived in Providence. The Jews of Providence who founded Temple Beth-El were predominantly Ashkenazi Jews from German-speaking areas. The majority of the early congregants were immigrants from Germany, the Netherlands, Hungary, and Poland.

The building was built in 1910–1911 and was the home of Sons of Israel (becoming known as "Temple Beth-El") until 1954. In 1954, Temple Beth-El moved to a new building on the East Side of Providence, with the old building serving as home to the Shaare Zedek congregation. In 2006, Shaare Zedek merged with Beth Shalom, and the Broad Street building was left vacant.

Due in part to 2008 financial crisis, Beth Shalom was unable to sell the building, and it became neglected and vandalized. In 2014, a developer purchased the building and the nonprofit Friends of Broad Street Synagogue was organized to turn the building into a community center.

== The Broad Street building ==
The Broad Street building, a Classical Revival brick structure, was designed by Banning & Thornton and built in 1910–11.

Architect Ira Rakatansky designed renovations to the building in 1955. An iron fence was added to separate the synagogue from Broad Street in 1984. The building was added to the National Register of Historic Places in 1988.

The old building, vacant since 2006, suffered severe vandalism and water damage. It has been named one of Providence's "Most Endangered Buildings" by the Providence Preservation Society eight times.

In 2024, the building was donated to the Center for Southeast Asians, which plans to restore and renovate the building as a community center.

== See also ==
- National Register of Historic Places listings in Providence, Rhode Island
