= Macaroni Riots =

1914 food riot in Providence, Rhode Island

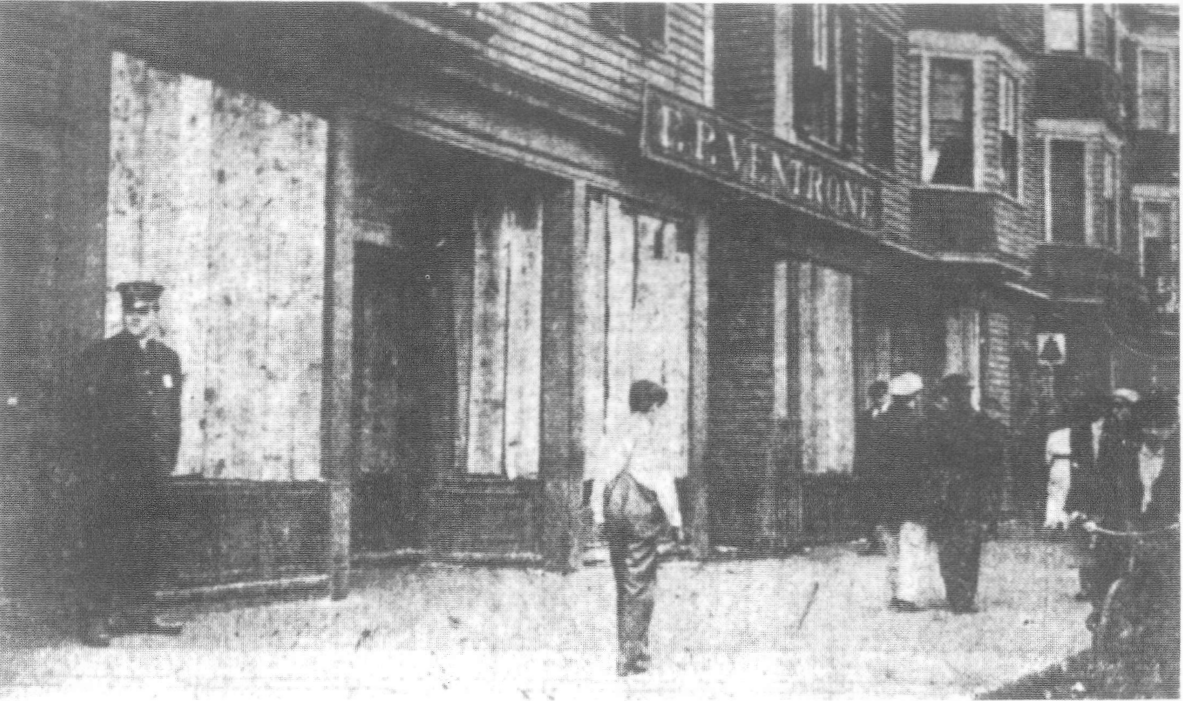
- Damage from rioting, pictured August 31, 1914
- Date: August 29 – September 7, 1914
- Location: Federal Hill, Providence, Rhode Island; 41°49′24.5″N 71°25′27.5″W
- Caused by: Increase in the price of foodstuffs, particularly pasta products; Anti-Italian discrimination
- Goals: Reduced price of pasta products
- Methods: Looting; Protesting; Rioting
- Result: Socialist activists negotiate a deal with local food wholesaler to lower prices

Parties
Italian American protestors	Providence Police Department

Casualties
- Injuries: Several dozen, including at least 14 by gunshot wounds
- Arrested: 50
- Damage: $20,000 in property damage ($643,000 in 2025)

The Macaroni Riots were a series of civil disturbances that took place in the Federal Hill neighborhood of Providence, Rhode Island, in 1914. The first riot occurred on the night of August 29 and was followed by additional nights of rioting on August 30 and September 7.

The food riot stemmed from an increase in the price of food, particularly pasta products such as macaroni, that affected the predominately Italian American population of Federal Hill in 1914. On August 22, socialist activists held a peaceful rally to protest the price increases, and on August 29, another rally turned violent as a mob of about 1,000 people marched down Atwells Avenue and looted the store of Frank P. Ventrone, a local food wholesaler who had been accused of profiteering. The angry mob caused thousands of dollars in damages and threw pasta products into the streets before police officers restored order. Additional rioting broke out the following night. Following this, socialist activists negotiated with Ventrone's associates and were able to broker a deal where he would sell his product at a reduced cost. Following a peaceful week, another riot occurred on the night of September 7 following a Labor Day rally that caused more property damage than the previous two riots combined. While additional rallies and protests occurred after this, the price protests slowly died down.

The rioting, which resulted in several thousand dollars in property damage, was the most severe civil disturbance in Providence since the Dorr Rebellion of 1841. In the end, 50 people were arrested and several dozen were injured, including at least 14 by gunshot wounds. Most of the arrested were charged with reveling and given light fines, while two people were found guilty of more severe charges and sentenced to several months in jail. In addition to the price increases, historians point to anti-Italian discrimination, especially among the police, and organization by radical groups such as the Industrial Workers of the World as contributing to the violence.

== Background ==
=== Italian Americans in Federal Hill ===
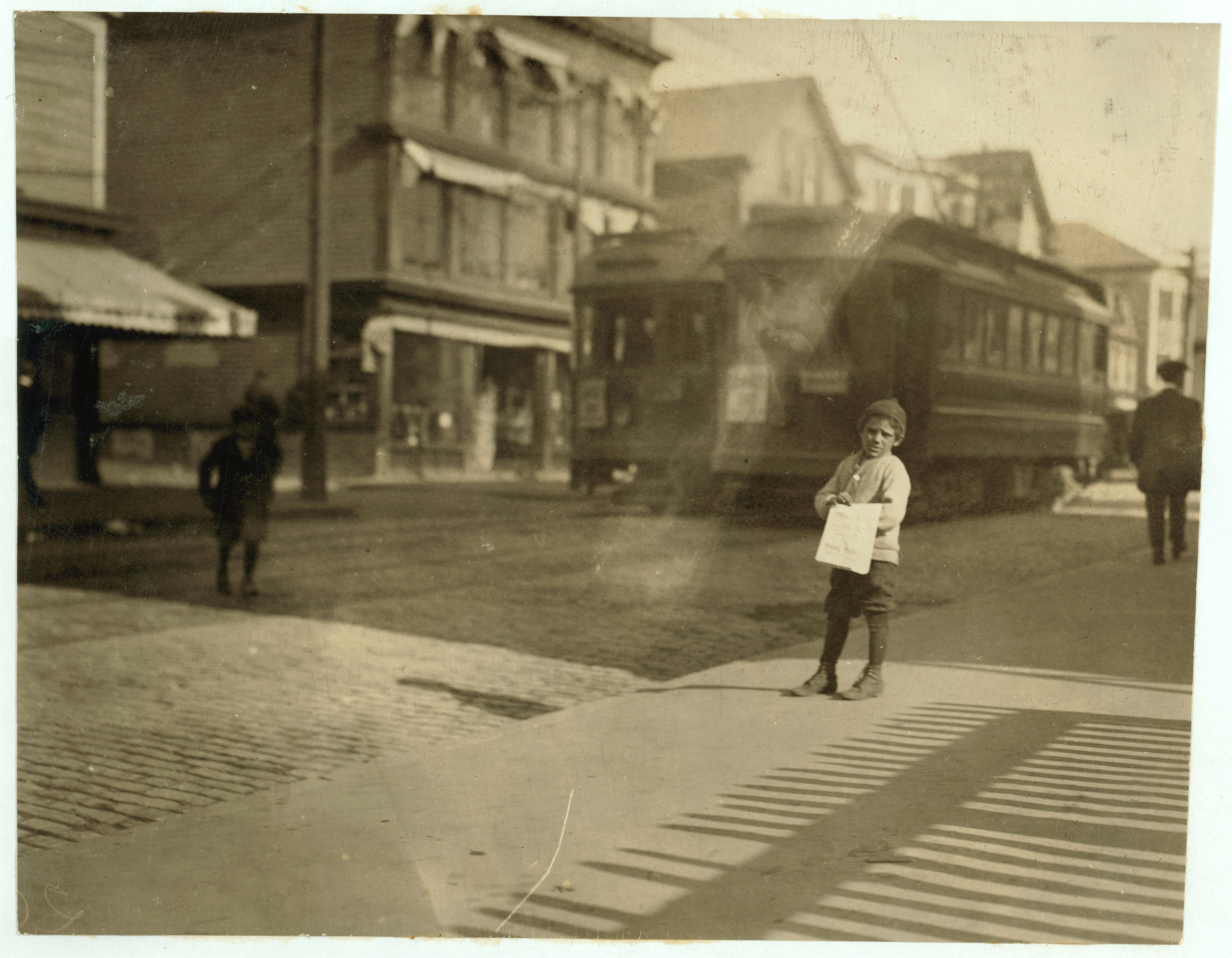
1912 street photograph of Atwells Avenue in the Federal Hill neighborhood of Providence, Rhode Island, by Lewis Hine

Federal Hill is a neighborhood in Providence, Rhode Island, situated directly west of the city's Downtown district. While populated mostly by working class Irish immigrants in the 1840s, Italian Americans began to settle in Federal Hill in the 1870s, eventually comprising about half of its population by 1895. Federal Hill became known as Providence's Little Italy. Its Italian population doubled from 18,000 to over 40,000 between 1905 and 1916. In addition to Federal Hill, other neighborhoods with sizeable Italian populations included Charles and Silver Lake.

These immigrants and their descendants faced anti-Italian discrimination from Providence's non-Italian White Americans. For example, the city's streetcar operator referred to its many Italian American workers by number rather than surname, and immigrant groups resisted settlement movement efforts to Americanize the community. Additionally, a 1911 shootout between police officers and an Italian American murder suspect in Federal Hill damaged the relationship between the police and the community. In some cases, Italian immigrants sought to resist discrimination by forming mutual benefit associations and joining activist groups, such as anarchist and socialist organizations and the Industrial Workers of the World (IWW), a militant labor union. In Federal Hill, the socialist movement included the weekly Labor Advocate newspaper and the Italian Socialist Club. (Note: Multiple sources, including a 2023 article in the magazine Jacobin and a 1996 article by historian Russell J. DeSimone in the journal Italian Americana, refer to the group of Italian socialists in Providence as the "Italian Socialist Club". However, in the same article, DeSimone also refers to the group as the "Italian Socialist Party". Additionally, in a 1996 article for the journal Rhode Island History, historian Joseph W. Sullivan referred to the group as the "Italian Socialist Federation", the terminology also used in a 2014 article in The Providence Journal.) On September 16, 1912, local socialist activists held a 2,000-person parade in support of labor organizers who had been arrested during the recent Lawrence textile strike, including Italian IWW organizers Joseph James Ettor and Arturo Giovannitti. During the parade, activists unfurled a red flag, leading to a violent confrontation between marchers and police that further soured relations.

=== Price increases during World War I ===
The 1913 U.S. economic downturn coincided with nationwide increases in foodstuff costs, some severe enough to result in starvation. Early in the year, an increase in the price of ice led to a 10 percent milk price increase in the neighboring state of Connecticut as well as Rhode Island, prompting the Providence city government to launch an investigation into the cause of the increases. A year later, Mayor John Purroy Mitchel of New York City ordered a broader investigation that blamed rising prices on a combination of the outbreak of World War I in Europe and increased hoarding. This investigation also noted that some instances of seller collusion may have contributed.

In Providence, much of the concern focused on the marked increase in wholesale prices for macaroni, as well as other pasta and Italian cuisine food products. Some in the Italian American community accused wholesalers of falsely labelling American-made pasta products as Italian-made and charging a greater price. Particular criticism was leveled against Frank P. Ventrone, a wholesaler of imported food products nicknamed the "Macaroni King". The Labor Advocate accused him of profiteering. In late July 1914, studies into the increased cost of living were launched by both Providence Mayor Joseph H. Gainer and Rhode Island Governor Aram J. Pothier. By the following month, Federal Hill foodstuff prices had increased 66 percent. (Note: The source from which this percentage comes from does not give an exact timespan over which this price increase occurred.)

== Protests and riots ==
=== August 22 ===
The Italian Socialist Club took an active role in organizing opposition to the price increases, which they contended constituted price gouging, and in mid-August 1914, they began to circulate flyers for a rally at the corner of Atwells Avenue and Dean Street in Federal Hill on August 22, a Saturday. (Note: Multiple sources state that the first rally against the price increases occurred on August 22. However, a 2014 article in The Providence Journal gives the date of August 21 for the first rally.) The rally attracted about 2,000 protestors, in addition to a detachment of over 70 law enforcement officers, including 7 mounted police officers on horseback. Starting at 7:15 p.m., over a dozen members of the socialist club gave speeches denouncing the price increases and, in particular, Ventrone, who was accused of intentionally mislabeling American-made pasta as Italian-made and charging a higher price. One speaker denounced the police in his speech, but because it was in Italian, the police, consisting largely of Irish and other non-Italian White Americans, did not interfere. Following the rally, the crowd dispersed peacefully.

After the demonstration, the two members of the Rhode Island House of Representatives who represented Federal Hill, both members of the Democratic Party, reached out to Governor Pothier to take action on the issue of profiteering. About a week after the rally, at 10:30 a.m. on August 24, Mayor Gainer called a private conference to address the results of his study, which he said revealed no evidence of price fixing or profiteering, a conclusion also yielded by Governor Pothier's investigation. These results were criticized by activists and the writers in the Labor Advocate, who accused the mayor of engaging in a "whitewash". Following this, activists began to circulate flyers for another rally to be held on August 29. Ventrone believed that the flyers implied that his store would be attacked and he requested police protection.

=== August 29 ===
Another rally was held in the early evening of August 29 at the same location as the first one a week prior, with a crowd of about 1,000 people. (Note: Several sources state that there were around 1,000 people in attendance at the August 29 rally. However, in a 2023 article for Jacobin, economist Brian Callaci states that this rally saw 2,000 attendees.) According to contemporary non-socialist media outlets, "agitators" from Boston and New York City had traveled to Providence to participate. Again, members of the Socialist Club gave speeches urging the attendees to take action against the price increases, and following the conclusion of the speeches, a large group of protestors began to move down Atwells Avenue towards Ventrone's store, which was located a few blocks away. Upon reaching Ventrone's business at 240-244 Atwells Avenue, the crowd began to break the windows and looted the building, stealing pasta and throwing foodstuffs onto the street. Several other businesses located on the same city block, including a barber shop, a dry goods store, and a pharmacy, were also looted. During the looting, one 20-year old rioter who had made it into Ventrone's store was struck by a projectile thrown by another rioter, sustaining a severe head injury.

During the rioting, streetcar services in the area were suspended, and many street vendors' pushcarts were seized by the mob. Additionally, firefighters arrived at the scene in response to a false alarm. Possibly due to the peaceful nature of the previous week's rally, the number of police officers present at this second rally proved ineffective at preventing the ensuing rioting. However, as additional officers arrived at the scene, the mob's violence began to redirect from the stores to the police. Rioters yelled insults at the officers and threw projectiles, such as rocks and bottles, causing some injuries. Eventually, a shootout commenced between the rioters and the police, resulting in at least three rioters and one police officer getting shot. The mob eventually scattered, fleeing from Atwells Avenue and attempting to regroup in smaller gatherings along the smaller side roads. By 6 p.m., the disturbances had mostly ceased, with 100 police officers, including several on horseback, patrolling Federal Hill. In total, only seven arrests were made, while the damage to Ventrone's property amounted to roughly $2,000 (equivalent to $64,000 in 2025).

=== August 30 ===
Through most of the early hours of the following day, August 30, Federal Hill was mostly peaceful. However, this changed around 3 p.m. with the arrival a process server who had a writ of capias for a Federal Hill resident. While the warrant specified that the individual was wanted for nonsupport, a crowd of Federal Hill residents believed that the arrest had something to do with the individuals involvement in the previous night's rioting, leading to a physical confrontation. Shortly afterwards, a group of boys began marching down Acorn Street, waving a red flag that they had made out of a flannel shirt and proclaiming in Italian, "Viva la rivolta!" (transl. Long live the revolt). This group of boys was eventually joined by several men who began throwing projectiles at the police. Police responded by opening fire into the crowd. During this confrontation, one police officer was knocked unconscious by a rock that had struck his head, while one fifteen-year-old protestor was shot in the chest, with many in the crowd believing the injury to be fatal. (Note: Both sources that mention this event do not claim with certainty that the bullet wound was fatal. In a 1996 article for the journal Rhode Island History, historian Joseph W. Sullivan stated that the gunshot "[inflicted] an apparently fatal wound" that left the teenager "gravely wounded". Meanwhile, in a 2014 article in the journal Italian Americana, historian Russell J. DeSimone said that the teenager "was thought to be fatally wounded" by the gunshot. However, both of these sources note that, according to contemporary records, it appears that the teenager later recovered from the gunshot.) Much of this fighting took place around the intersection of Atwells and Arthur Avenues.

Following the shooting, the police officer who was accused of shooting the fifteen-year-old was beaten and chased by the crowd, and he eventually fled to a fire station at the corner of Atwells and America Street. Members of the crowd followed and engaged in fighting with the firefighters there. One of the firefighters was shot in the face, with a bullet striking his ear. Eventually, Providence's Chief of Police John A. Murray sent every available officer to Federal Hill to quell the rioting, many equipped with nightsticks and on horseback. On Atwells Avenue, the mob, numbering about 2,500 in total, clashed with about 300 police officers, exchanging gunfire, throwing projectiles, and assaulting each other for about 20 minutes before the police, with a volley of gunfire that struck about a dozen rioters, were able to disperse the large crowd. During the fighting, the police fired so many bullets that an addition 1,200 rounds of ammunition were brought in from the city's Central Police Station. Sporadic violence continued until about 7 p.m., when the police had effectively cleared Federal Hill of any crowds.

In the aftermath, some of the injured were taken to Rhode Island Hospital, though many of the injured protestors, fearful of being arrested, avoided the hospital and sought medical assistance elsewhere. In total, the number of injured by gunfire included one firefighter, eleven citizens, and at least one police officer. (Note: Sources vary slightly on the exact number of police officers who were injured. Historian Joseph W. Sullivan, in a 1996 article in Rhode Island History, states that eight police officers were treated for non-gunshot wounds, while another had been injured by gunfire. However, historian Russell J. DeSimone gives a slightly different count in a 2014 article for Italian Americana of "eighteen people injured: six policemen, one fireman and eleven citizens".) Several commercial buildings were damaged, including a bakery, a Chinese laundry, a department store, and a pool hall, while additional damage occurred to a primary school and several tenements.

=== August 31 ===
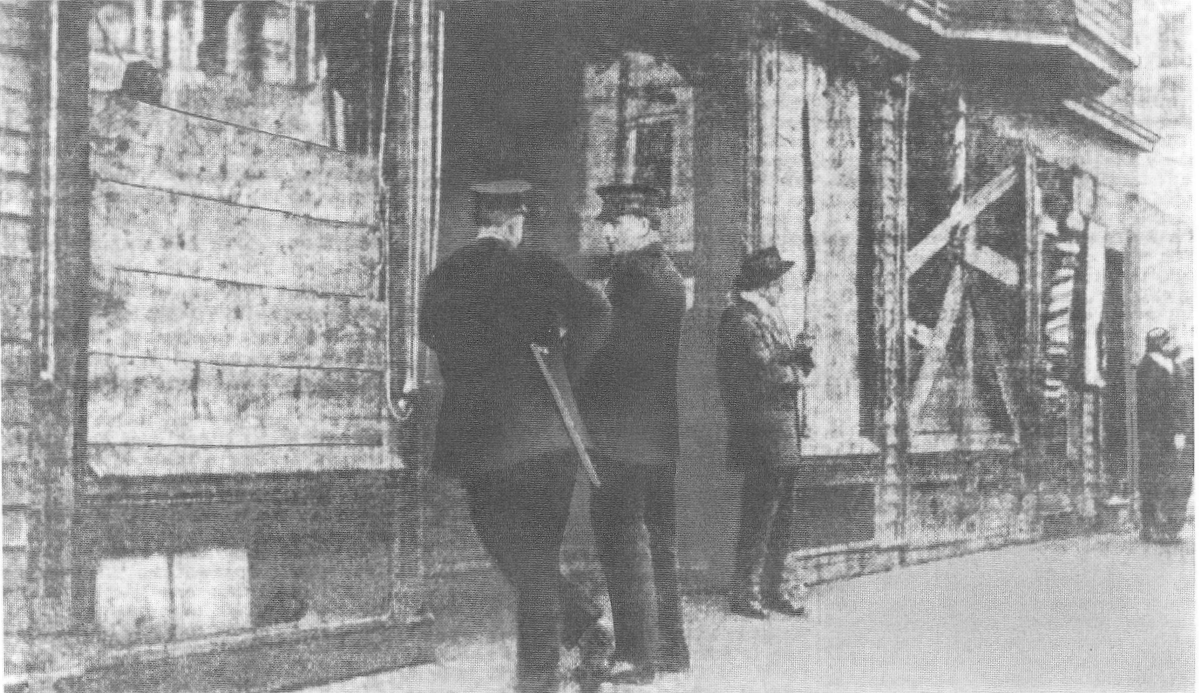
Police patrolling Federal Hill on August 31

On August 31, about 200 police officers patrolled Federal Hill, especially the area around Atwells Avenue. That same day, a meeting was held between Italian socialists and representatives of Ventrone's business, which was organized by a reporter for the local Evening Tribune newspaper. During the meeting, Ventrone's representatives stated that, while Ventrone was not responsible for the increased food prices, he would agree to sell his pasta products to the general public at the same price that he was selling to retailers. The socialists, who refused to give their names, agreed to the deal and signed on behalf of their socialist organization. Additionally, the socialists denounced the violence from the previous nights' riots and publicly dispelled a rumor that they had invited Joe Sullivan, a noted anarchist from New York City, and Arturo Giovannitti to come to Providence to help lead the protests. Throughout the day, while there were rumors of possible rioting planned in Silver Lake and along West Exchange Street, nothing came of these, and the day passed without a riot. The following day, the deal was reported on by The Providence Journal.

=== September 7 ===
Following the August 30 riot, socialist activists, including members of the IWW, organized plans for a gathering on Labor Day, September 7, in Olneyville, a neighborhood near Federal Hill. This was in opposition to a parade that was being held in Downtown by the more conservative American Federation of Labor. Starting around 2:30 p.m., the Olneyville rally saw about 1,000 people in attendance, with several plainclothes law enforcement scattered throughout the crowd. Speeches were made by many IWW members and socialist politicians, with many of them denouncing the violence of the riots, but celebrating the price decreases that had resulted in part from them. Additionally, activists urged community members to rally outside of the Sixth District Court House on September 10, when the trial of Emmanuel Parotti, one of the rioters arrested during the initial break-in of Ventrone's business, was scheduled. Reflecting the composition of the crowd, speeches throughout the day were given in English, French, and Italian. The rally ended around 4 p.m.

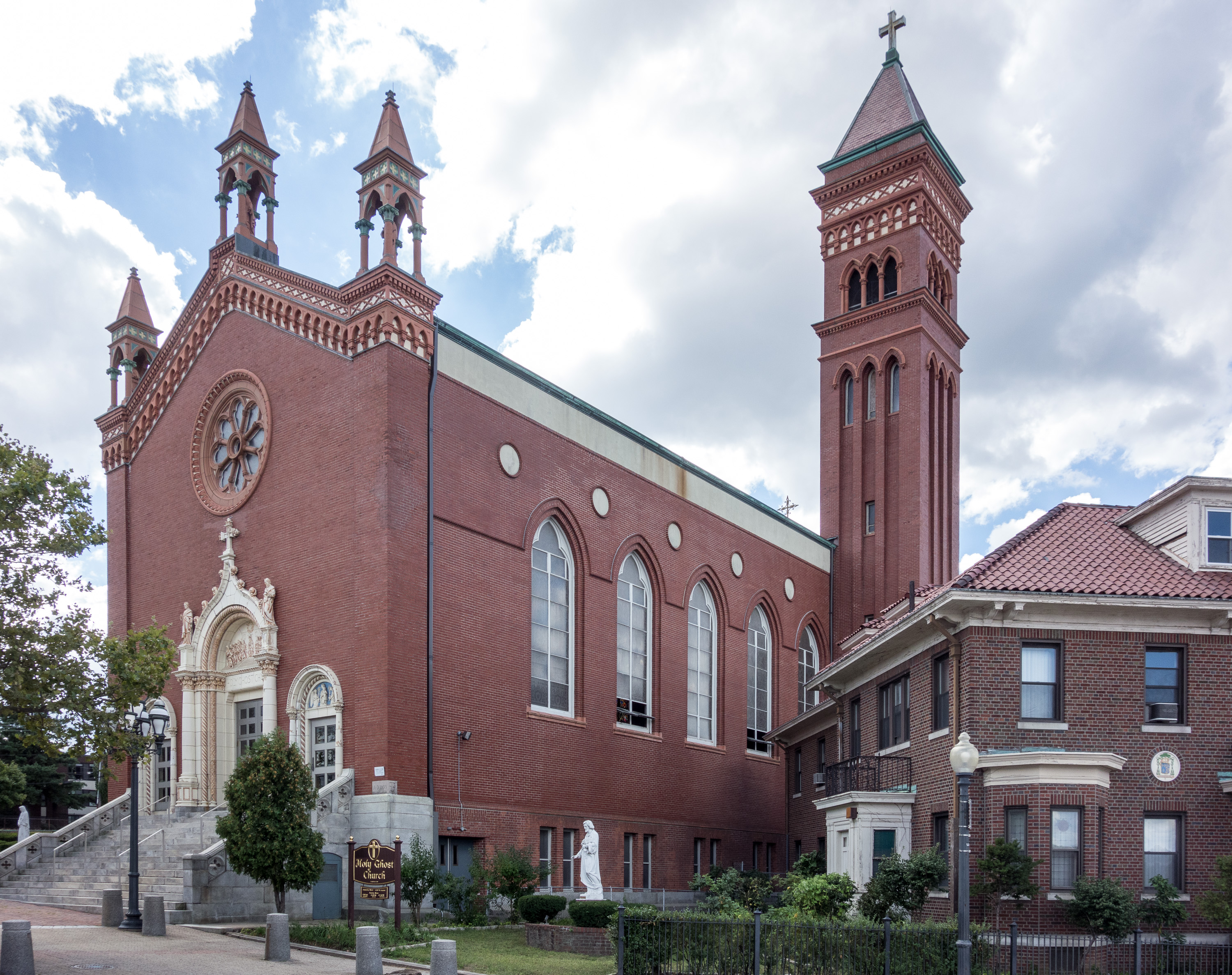
The Labor Day rioting began in the vicinity of the Holy Ghost Church (pictured 2016) in Federal Hill.

Following the rally, about 100 people, mostly young men, began to make their way back to Federal Hill. When the group had reached the Holy Ghost Church, an older man began speaking and urged the group to grab sticks and rocks. Soon, a large mob began marching along Atwells Avenue, throwing rocks indiscriminately at building windows. Several stores had their windows destroyed, and some looting occurred. This mob was soon met with a police force of about 200 officers, including 25 mounted officers, who had been alerted by plainclothes officers in the crowd. Due to the large number of injuries sustained by protestors in the previous riots, officers were given orders to not fire their weapons. Despite this, the police were able to defuse the situation within 30 minutes of arrival, making 23 arrests in the process. While there had been fewer injuries than in the previous nights of rioting, there had been more property damage than in the previous two nights combined, with the Evening Tribune describing Federal Hill as resembling a "war zone".

=== Later protests ===
On September 10, during Parotti's trial, several thousand protestors gathered outside of the courthouse, with about 300 law enforcement officers present as well. Despite fears that a fourth night of rioting would come out of this, the crowd dispersed peacefully following the conclusion of the trial, which lasted three and a half hours. According to historian Evelyn Savidge Sterne, tensions simmered until September 14, when other neighborhood grocers agreed to reduce the prices of their pasta products. A rally that socialists had planned to hold on September 16 over high food prices took place attracted a large crowd in Providence's Charles neighborhood, but the event, which was patrolled by 25 police officers, ended peacefully, with only a few arrests made for blocking sidewalks.

== Aftermath ==
In total, 50 people were arrested for their participation in the three nights of rioting, which local newspapers dubbed the "Macaroni Riots". While nobody was killed, at least 14 individuals suffered gunshot wounds, and several dozen were injured, often from being hit by projectiles. Total damages, including property damage and loss of inventory, amounted to roughly $20,000 ($643,000 in 2025) for merchants in Federal Hill. Multiple historians consider the riots to be among the worst incidents of civil disorder in Providence, behind the Lane riots of 1831 and the Dorr Rebellion of 1841.

=== Legal consequences ===
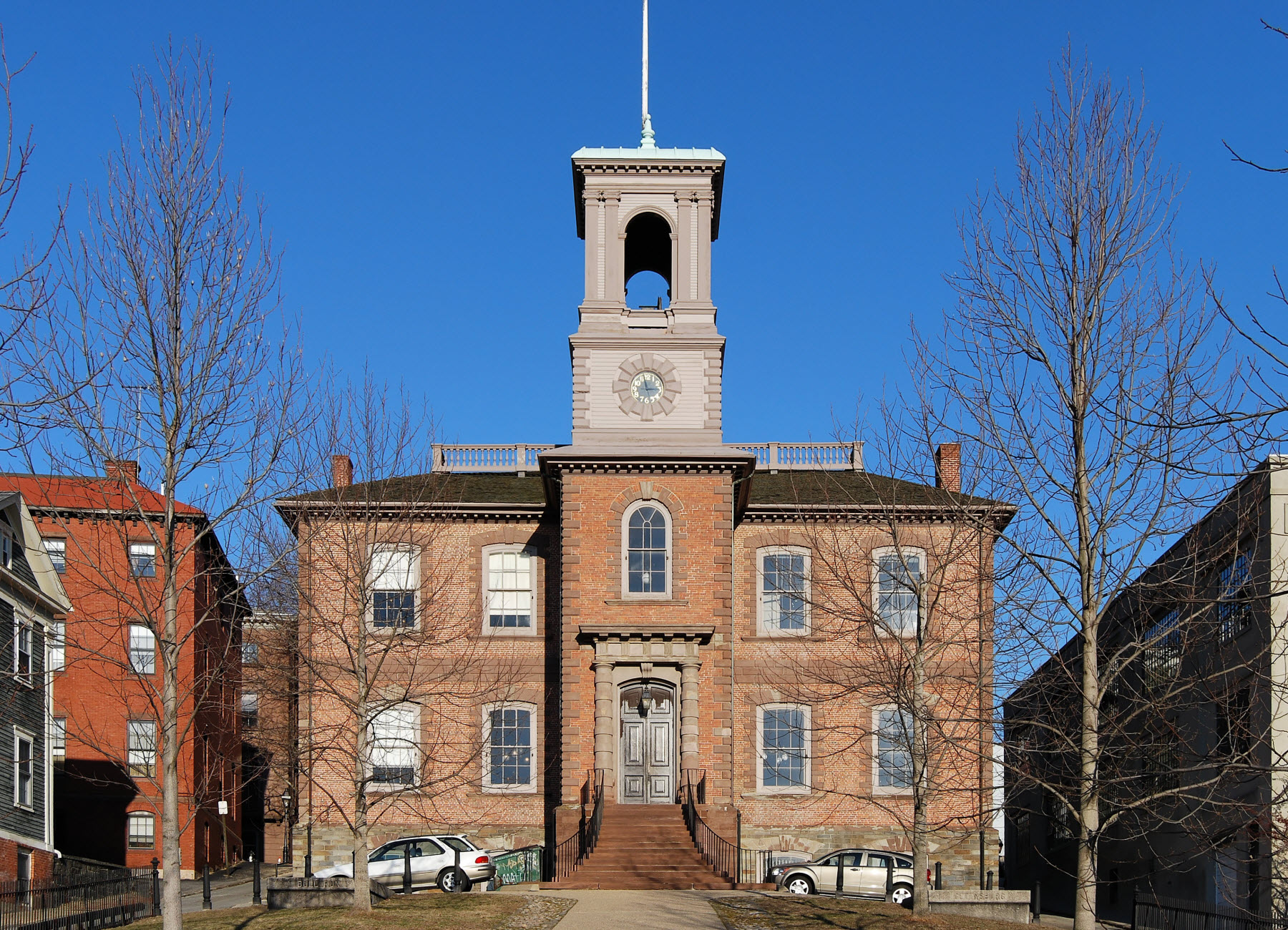
The trial of Emmanuel Parotti took place at the Sixth District Court House (pictured 2008).

Because nobody had read the riot act during any of the disturbances, almost none of the arrested were charged with riotous assembly, but instead with the lesser charge of reveling, with fines of between $15 ($480 in 2025) and $30 ($960 in 2025), plus court costs. However, Parotti was found guilty on two counts of vandalism for property damage to both Ventrone's store and a streetcar and was given a six-month sentence in the Providence County Jail, as well as a fine of $50 ($1,610 in 2025). However, his lawyer stated that he planned to appeal the decision. Additionally, two people arrested during the Labor Day riot were found guilty of carrying a concealed weapon and given fines of between $35 ($1,130 in 2025) and $50 ($1,610 in 2025). Additionally, one of the arrested was given a three-month prison sentence.

=== Historical analysis ===
Concerning the causes of the riots, Sterne cites both the economic difficulties and the overall anti-Italian sentiment in Providence as underlying reasons. In a 2016 book, she writes that, while the price increases had been "the trigger" of the riots, "the underlying cause had been long-simmering grievances over economic and social discrimination in the new country". In the same vein, historian David J. Naumec notes that the riots may have been pushback against certain reforms being pushed by the Protestant activists involved in the settlement house movement. Meanwhile, historian Joseph W. Sullivan emphasizes in a 1996 article in Rhode Island History the role that the IWW played in organizing the protests, calling the riots "the climax of two years of vigorous organizing efforts" by the organization. In a 2000 book, historian Mimi Abramovitz considers the riots in Providence as part of a larger trend of protests that took place in the United States during the early 20th century over rising costs, including both food prices and rent. Examples of other food-cost protests during the time include a 1902 meat boycott in New York City, several rent strikes between 1904 and 1907 in the Northeast megalopolis, and a 1910 protest by Jewish women in Providence against kosher butchers. With the 1910 protest, historian Russell J. DeSimone draws parallels to the 1914 pasta price protests, as in both cases, members of the city's ethnic communities (Italians in Federal Hill and Jews in South Providence) protested against high food prices and discrimination.

In contemporary reporting, many local newspapers differentiated the August riots from the Labor Day riot, stressing that the latter was simply an act of mass hooliganism and not a direct response to the food price increases as the ones in August had been. However, both DeSimone and Sullivan reject this and argue that the Labor Day riot was a continuation of the rioting from the previous month. According to DeSimone, the unrest had, by September, "become as much a revolt against police treatment of residents in Providence's Little Italy as it was about the cost of macaroni". Additionally concerning the role that the poor relationship between the police and Italian Americans played in the riots, DeSimone writes, "there was no love lost between the police and the Italians of Providence; this mutual feeling of dislike would be a factor in the macaroni riots of 1914".

=== Later history ===
As World War I continued in Europe, the United States experienced a hiring boom and, while food prices did increase over the course of the conflict, wages also generally rose with it. Also during this time, the IWW entered a period of decline that coincided with a greater assimilation of Italian Americans into American society. The Italian population in Providence also continued to grow over the next several years, and by 1930, 20 percent of the city, or roughly 50,000 people, were Italian Americans. In Providence, Italian Americans began to become more active in mainstream politics, particularly within the Democratic Party, resulting in the election of the first Italian American to a state office with Rhode Island Secretary of State Louis W. Cappelli in 1932. Several years later, in 1945, John Pastore, who was raised in Federal Hill, became Rhode Island's first Italian American governor.

On November 17, 2014, the Rhode Island Labor History Society held an event at a local church in Federal Hill to commemorate the 100th anniversary of the riots. Writing that same year, DeSimone said concerning the lasting legacy of the riots, "The macaroni riots were important for Providence's Italian community, it was more than just about the high cost of food, war profiteering, class differences or police brutality; it was about learning to think of itself as a community of Italian Americans fully engaged in partaking of the American experience".

== See also ==
- Galleanisti
- History of Providence, Rhode Island
- List of incidents of civil unrest in the United States
- List of food riots

== Sources ==
- Abramovitz, Mimi (2000) [1996]. Under Attack, Fighting Back: Women and Welfare in the United States (Updated ed.). New York City: Monthly Review Press. ISBN 978-1-58367-008-8. LCCN 99087575. OCLC 43095834.
- Callaci, Brian (June 11, 2023). "When Socialists Put an End to Pasta Inflation". Jacobin. ISSN 2158-2602. OCLC 677928766. Archived from the original on September 9, 2024.
- DeSimone, Russell J. (Summer 2014). "Providence's "Macaroni Riots" of 1914". Italian Americana. 32 (2): 133–145. ISSN 0096-8846. JSTOR 43926746. LCCN 75641589. OCLC 891511663.
- DeSimone, Russell (January 11, 2015). "The Providence Macaroni Riots of 1914". The Online Review of Rhode Island History. Archived from the original on September 13, 2024.
- Molloy, Scott (November 12, 2014). "Scott Molloy: Riots rocked Federal Hill 100 years ago". The Providence Journal. ISSN 2574-3406. OCLC 920412096. Archived from the original on September 11, 2024.
- Naumec, David J. (2017). "Federal Hill (Providence, Rhode Island)". In Ueda, Reed (ed.). America's Changing Neighborhoods: An Exploration of Diversity through Places. Vol. 2. Santa Barbara, California: Greenwood Press. pp. 453–459. ISBN 978-1-4408-2865-2. LCCN 2017020316. OCLC 984512368.
- "Federal Hill Timeline". Rhode Island Monthly. September 26, 2007. ISSN 1041-1380. OCLC 18499849. Archived from the original on September 26, 2023.
- Sterne, Evelyn Savidge (2003). Appleby, R. Scott (ed.). Ballots and Bibles: Ethnic Politics and the Catholic Church in Providence. Cushwa Center Studies of Catholicism in Twentieth-Century America. Ithaca, New York: Cornell University Press. ISBN 978-0-8014-4117-2. LCCN 2003011983. OCLC 10019387154.
- Sterne, Evelyn (2016). "Catholicism and Working-Class Activism in Providence". In Cantwell, Christopher D.; Carter, Heath W.; Drake, Janine Giordano (eds.). The Pew and the Picket Line: Christianity and the American Working Class. Urbana, Illinois: University of Illinois Press. pp. 51–73. ISBN 978-0-252-09817-8. LCCN 2021701877. OCLC 939827460.
- Sullivan, Joseph W. (May 1996). ""Every Shout a Cannon Ball": The IWW and Urban Disorders in Providence, 1912–1914" (PDF). Rhode Island History. 54 (2). Providence, Rhode Island: Rhode Island Historical Society: 51–64. ISSN 0035-4619. LCCN 48032992. OCLC 1696593. Archived from the original (PDF) on July 18, 2020.
