= History of Providence, Rhode Island =

United States municipal history

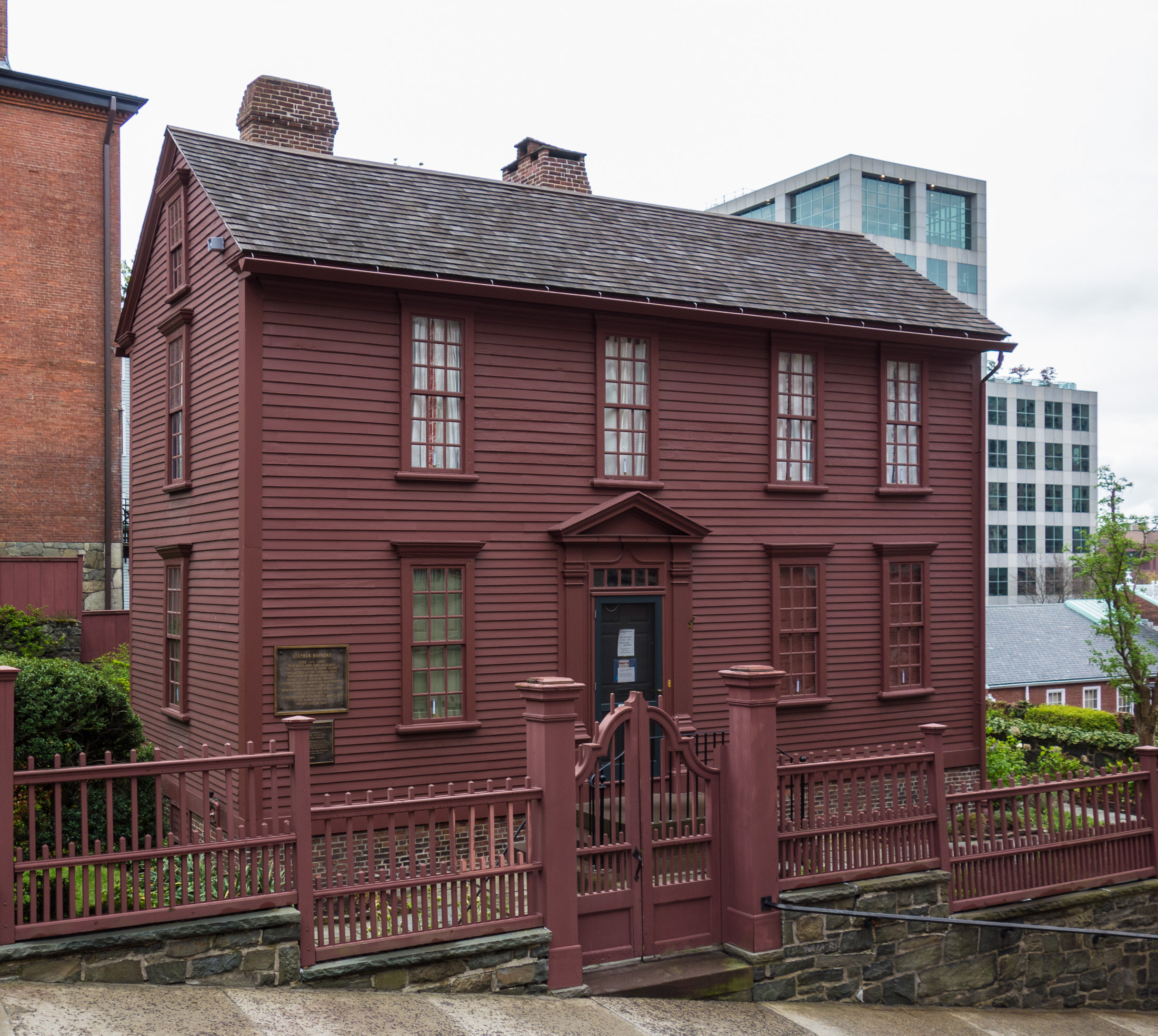
The Stephen Hopkins House is the oldest extant house in Providence

The Rhode Island city of Providence has a nearly 400-year history integral to that of the United States, including significance in the American Revolutionary War by providing leadership and fighting strength, quartering troops, and supplying goods to residents by circumventing the blockade of Newport. The city is also noted for the first bloodshed of the American Revolution in the Gaspée Affair. Additionally, Providence is notable for economic shifts, moving from trading to manufacturing. The decline of manufacturing devastated the city during the Great Depression, but the city eventually attained economic recovery through investment of public funds.

== Founding and colonial era ==
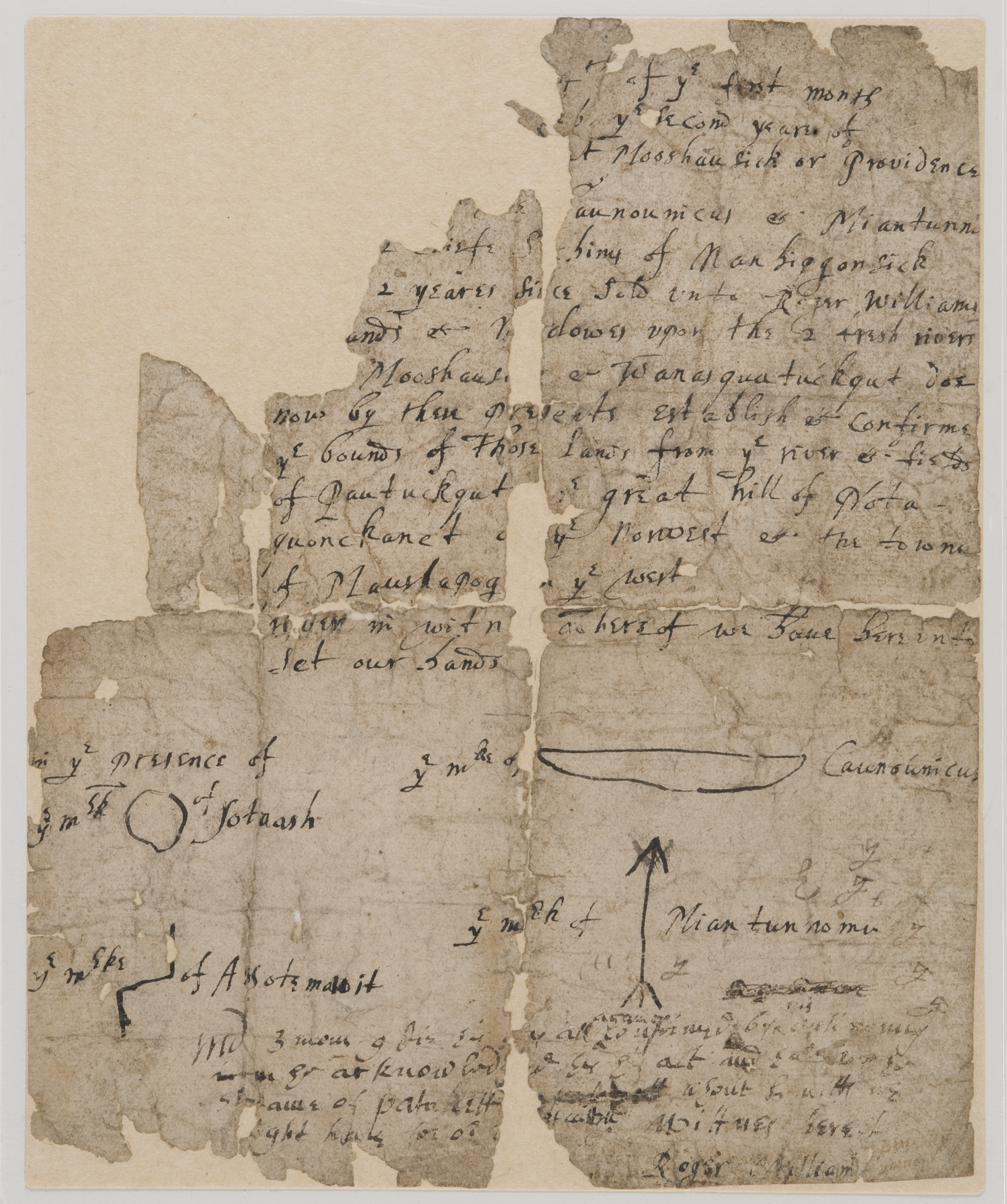
The original 1636 deed to Providence, signed by Chief Canonicus

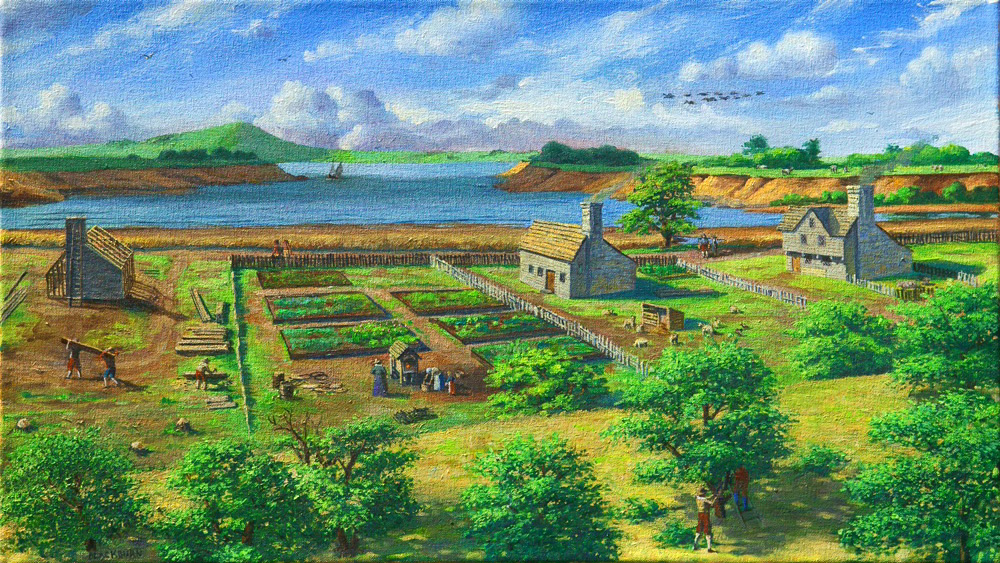
An artist's conception of how Providence may have appeared in 1650—14 years after its establishment.

Providence was settled in June 1636 by Puritan theologian Roger Williams and grew into one of the original Thirteen Colonies. As a minister in the Massachusetts Bay Colony, Williams had advocated the separation of church and state and condemned colonists' confiscation of land from Native Americans. He was convicted of sedition and heresy and banished from the colony. Williams and others established a settlement in Rumford, Rhode Island in 1636 on land given to them by the Wampanoag. Soon after settling, the Plymouth Colony warned Williams that he had still not left the bounds of the colony. In response, the group moved down the Seekonk River, around the point now known as Fox Point and up the Providence River to the confluence of the a Moshassuck and Woonasquatucket Rivers. Here they established a new settlement they termed "Providence Plantations," cultivating the community as a refuge for religious dissenters.

For the land, Williams reached a verbal agreement with the sachems Canonicus and Miantonomo—leaders of the indigenous Narragansett inhabitants. This agreement was later formalized in a deed dated March 24, 1638.

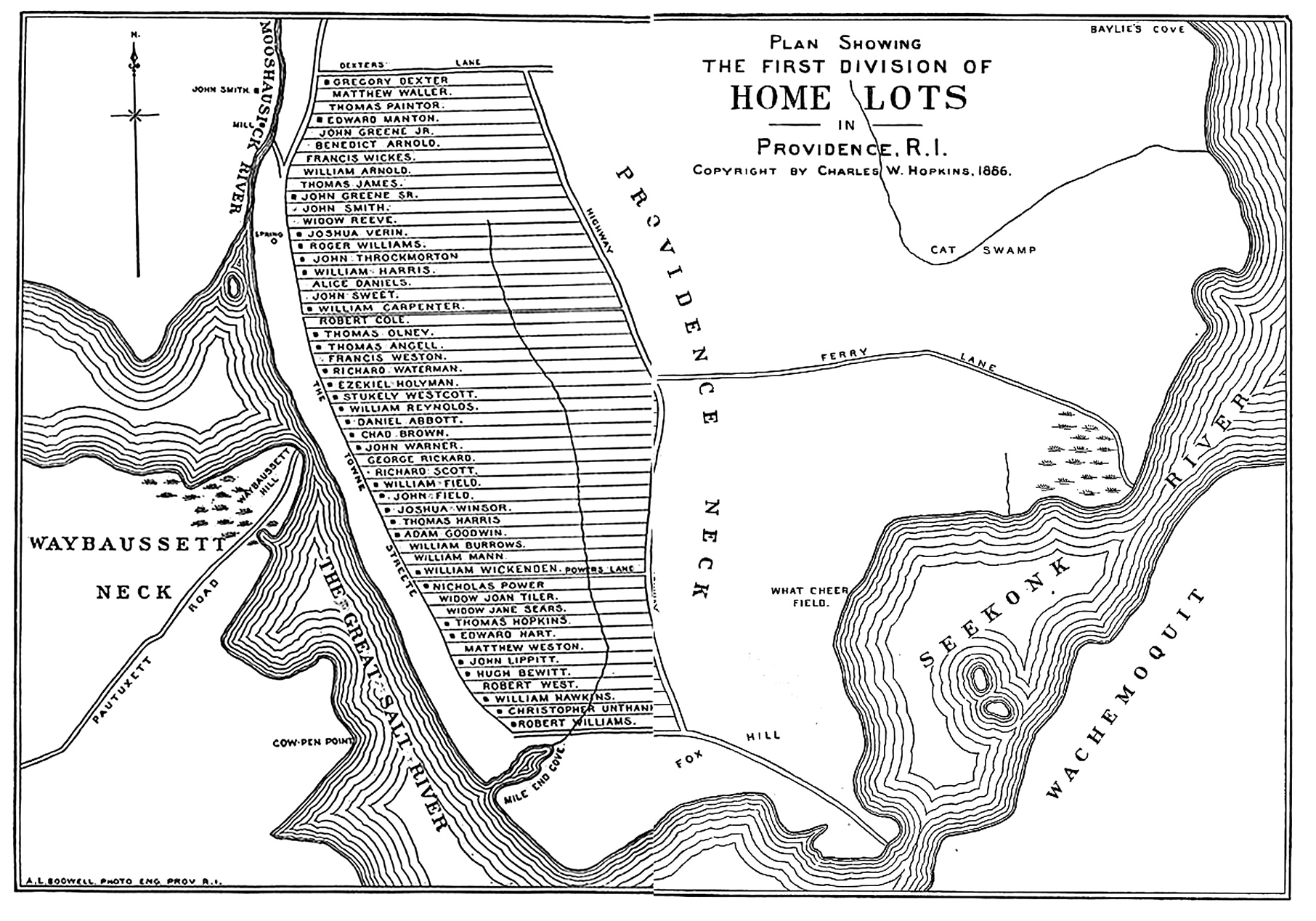
The original town layout of Providence Plantations; many of the streets on the East Side are named after the original homestead strip owners

Unlike Salem and Boston, Providence lacked a royal charter. The settlers thus organized themselves, allotting tracts on the eastern side of the Providence River in 1638. Roughly six acres each, these home lots extended from Towne Street (now South Main Street) up the eastern hill to Hope Street. The portion of land between Towne Street and the eastern bank of the Providence River was held in common.

Although the settlers were religious (mostly Baptist and other dissenting Puritans), the settlement lacked an official religion; no meeting house was erected in the town until 1700. In the absence of a meeting house, the settlers congregated for religious and civil purposes on the common land adjacent to Roger Williams' home lot and later in the 1646 mill built by John Smith.

Over the following two decades, Providence Plantations grew into a self-sufficient agricultural and fishing settlement, though its lands were difficult to farm and its borders were disputed with Connecticut and Massachusetts. During this period, the original temporary log dwellings built by the first settlers gave way to new clapboard stone-end houses with gabled roofs.

An Indian coalition burned Providence to the ground on March 29, 1676, during King Philip's War, making it one of two major Colonial settlements burned. The only two houses known to have survived the fire are the William Field House and Roger Mowry Tavern, both of which have since been demolished.

After the town was rebuilt, the economy expanded into more industrial and commercial activity. The outer lands of Providence Plantation extending to the Massachusetts and Connecticut borders were incorporated as Scituate, Glocester, and Smithfield, Rhode Island, in 1731. Later, Cranston, Johnston, and North Providence were also carved out of Providence's municipal territory.

In 1700, the first church building was erected in the city—the first meeting house of the First Baptist Church of Providence, established in 1638, on the corner of Smith and North Main Streets.

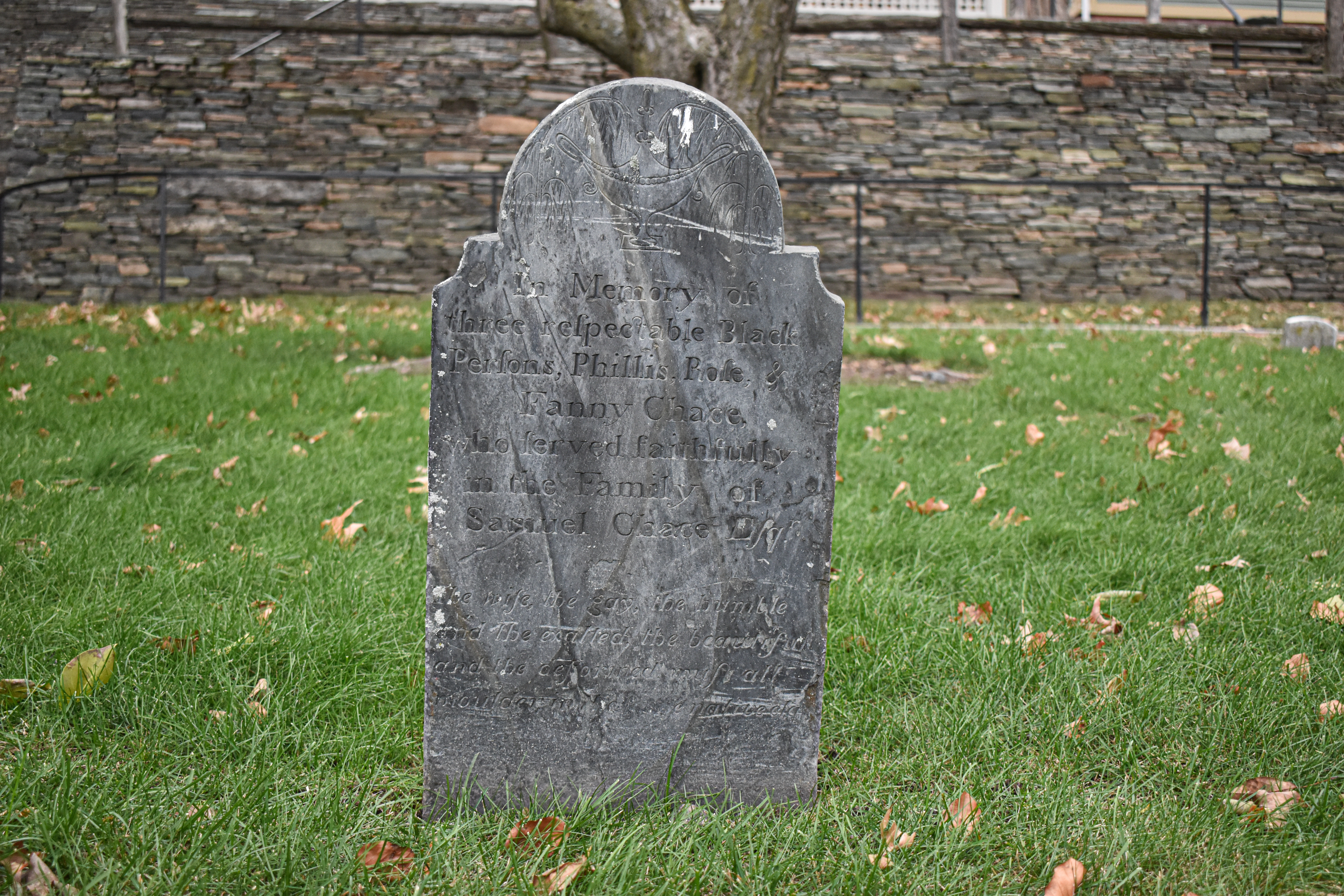
This headstone in the cemetery of the Cathedral of St. John marks the graves of three enslaved Black residents of Providence.

Colonial administrators in Providence banned the enslavement of black people and Native Americans in 1652 and 1676, respectively. In 1703, the Rhode Island General Assembly overruled the municipal statutes and legalized black and Native slavery throughout the colony. Merchants in Providence supplied sugar plantations in the West Indies with slaves, livestock, dairy products, fish, candles and lumber, and received molasses for rum. The trade particularly flourished after 1730, helping to establish the city as a major port. In 1755, enslaved people accounted for 8 percent of Providence's population At the time, enslaved people made up 10% of Rhode Island's population, with higher concentrations in Newport and Narragansett Country, while enslaved population averaged 5% for the northern colonies.

By the 1760s, the population of the city's urban core reached 4,000.

In 1770, Brown University moved to Providence from nearby Warren. At the time, the college was known as Rhode Island College and occupied a single building on College Hill. The college's choice to relocate to Providence as opposed to Newport symbolized a larger shift away from the latter city's commercial and political dominance over the colony.

== American Revolution ==
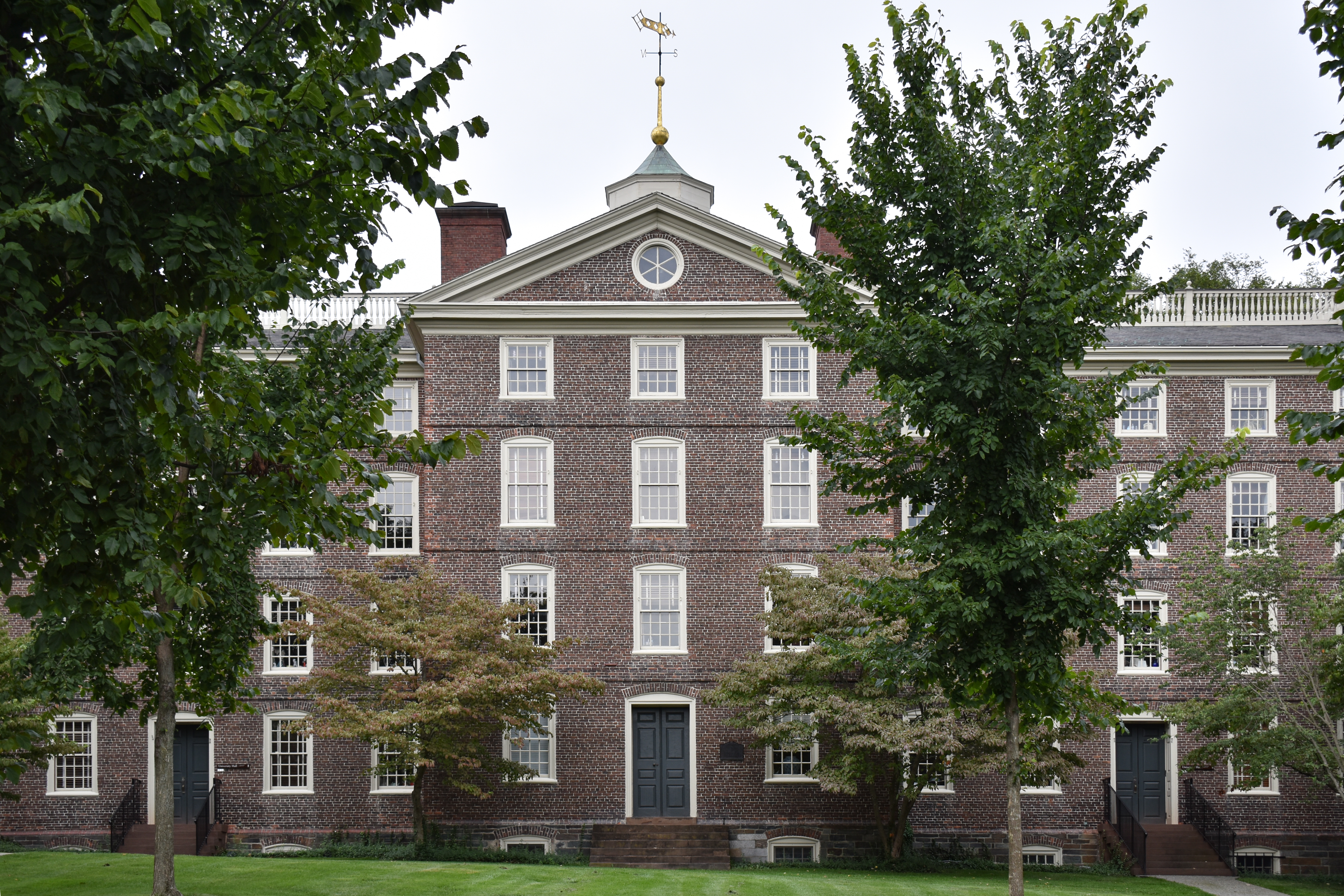
During the Revolutionary War, Brown University's University Hall served as barracks and as a military hospital.

In 1776, Providence recorded a population of 4,321.

During the 1770s, the British government levied taxes that impeded Providence's maritime, fishing, and agricultural industries, the mainstays of the city's economy. One example was the Sugar Act, which affected Providence's distilleries and its trade in rum. These taxes and other official acts of the British crown caused the Colony of Rhode Island to renounce allegiance to Britain—the first of the Thirteen Colonies to do so. Providence residents were also among the first to spill blood in the American Revolution during the Gaspée Affair in 1772, an act of open defiance that preceded the more famous Boston Tea Party by more than a year.

Providence escaped British occupation during the American Revolutionary War, although the British captured Newport and imposed a blockade that devastated the island's economy.

During the war, American troops were quartered in Providence. Brown University's University Hall was used as a barracks and military hospital for American soldiers, while French troops were quartered in the city's Market House.

== Late 18th and Early 19th Centuries ==
=== Economic and demographic shifts ===
During the late 18th and early 19th century, the city became a center of the lucrative China Trade. Between 1789 and 1841, Providence was one of America's major ports trading directly with China. During this era, three of the seven US consuls to China came from Providence. Exchange with Canton and the East Indies benefited Providence merchants immensely. With their newly accrued wealth, many members of this merchant class constructed large mansions on College Hill; among these homes are the Nightingale–Brown House (1792) and Corliss–Carrington House (1812). After 1830, Providence's trade shifted to Canada, which supplied the rapidly industrializing city with coal and lumber.

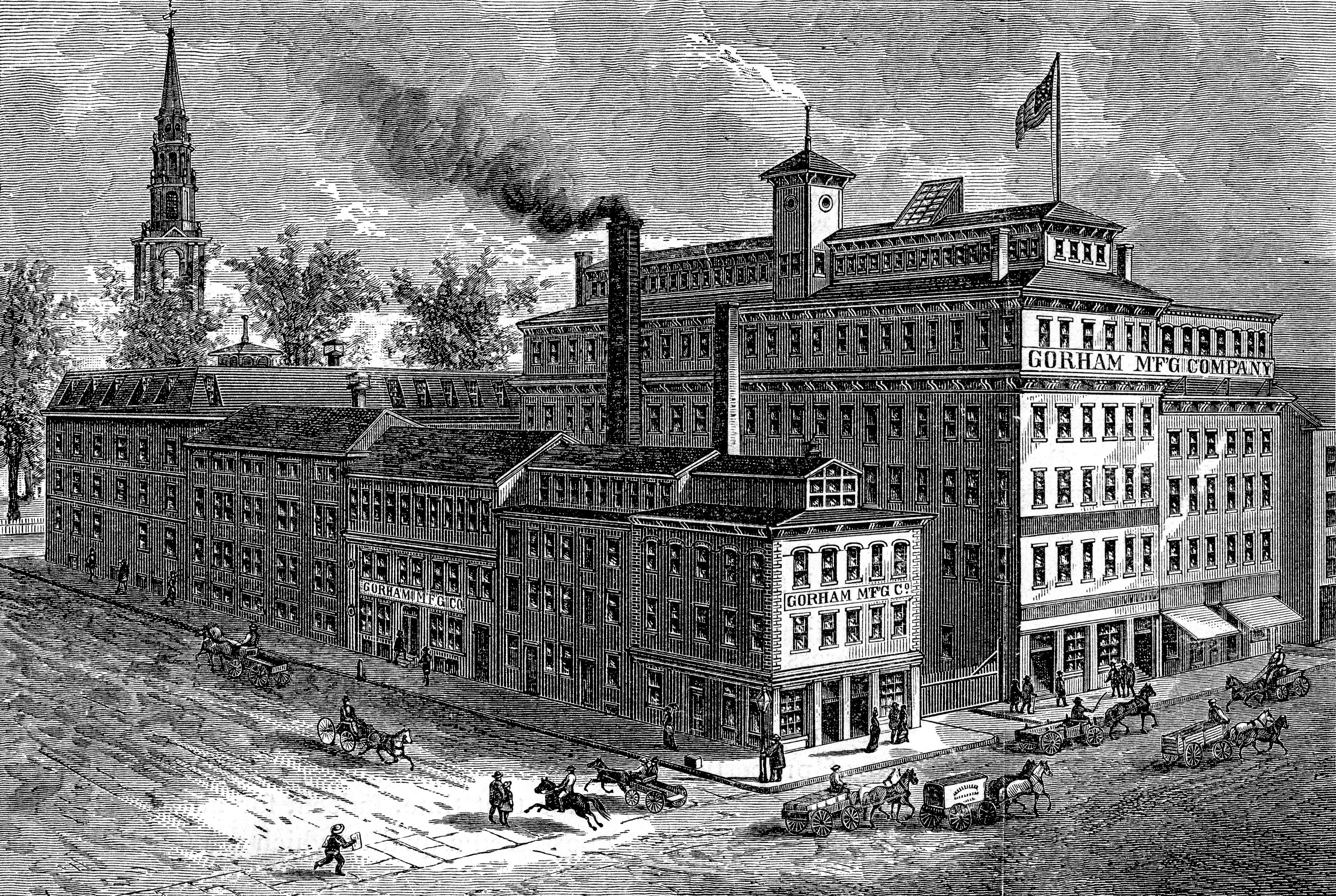
Gorham Manufacturing Company's works on Canal, Steeple, and North Main Streets, Providence, 1886

During the early 19th century, the economy began to shift from maritime endeavors to manufacturing—particularly machinery, tools, silverware, jewelry, and textiles. At one time, Providence boasted some of the largest manufacturing plants in the country, including Brown & Sharpe, Nicholson File, and Gorham Manufacturing Company. The city's industries attracted many immigrants from Ireland, Germany, Sweden, England, Italy, Portugal, Cape Verde, and French Canada.

These economic and demographic shifts caused social strife. Hard Scrabble and Snow Town were the sites of race riots in 1824 and 1831.

Providence residents ratified a city charter in 1831 as the population passed 17,000.

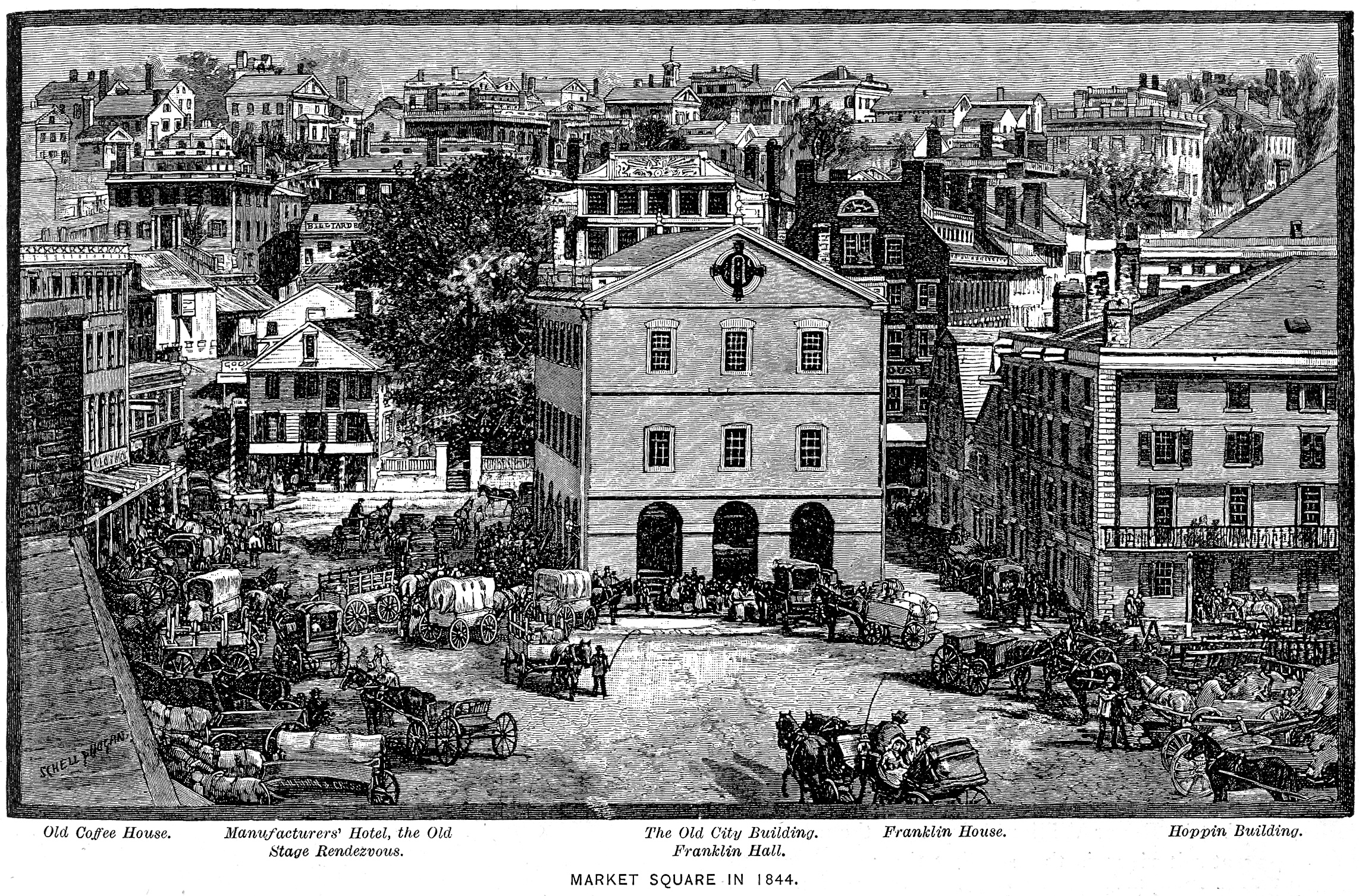
Market Square was the center of civic life in the 19th Century, and Market House was home to the city council before City Hall was built.

=== Seat of government ===
The city government was housed in the Market House from its incorporation as a city in 1832 until 1878. Market House is located in Market Square, which was the geographic and social center of the city. The city offices quickly outgrew this building, and the City Council resolved to create a permanent municipal building in 1845. The city spent the next 30 years searching for a suitable location, resulting in what one historian calls "Providence's Thirty Years War," as the council bickered over where to situate the new building. The city offices moved into the Providence City Hall in 1878.

=== Jewelry industry ===
During 19th and 20th centuries, the manufacturing of jewelry and costume jewelry emerged as a dominant local industry. Jewelry manufacturing began in Providence in 1794, and by 1880 Rhode Island's jewelry industry accounted for more than one quarter of the entire national jewelry production. By 1890, the city was home to 200 jewelry firms employing 7,000 workers.

During the 1960s, jewelry trade magazines referred to Providence as "the jewelry capital of the world." The industry peaked in 1978 with 32,500 workers, then began a swift decline. By 1996, the number of jewelry workers shrank to 13,500.

During the following decades, the large jewelry factories that had once dominated the city's Jewelry District were closed or vacated. Many of these buildings have since been renovated and repurposed for commercial, retail, residential, and educational use, mirroring the city's broader shift from a manufacturing to service economy.

== Late 19th Century ==
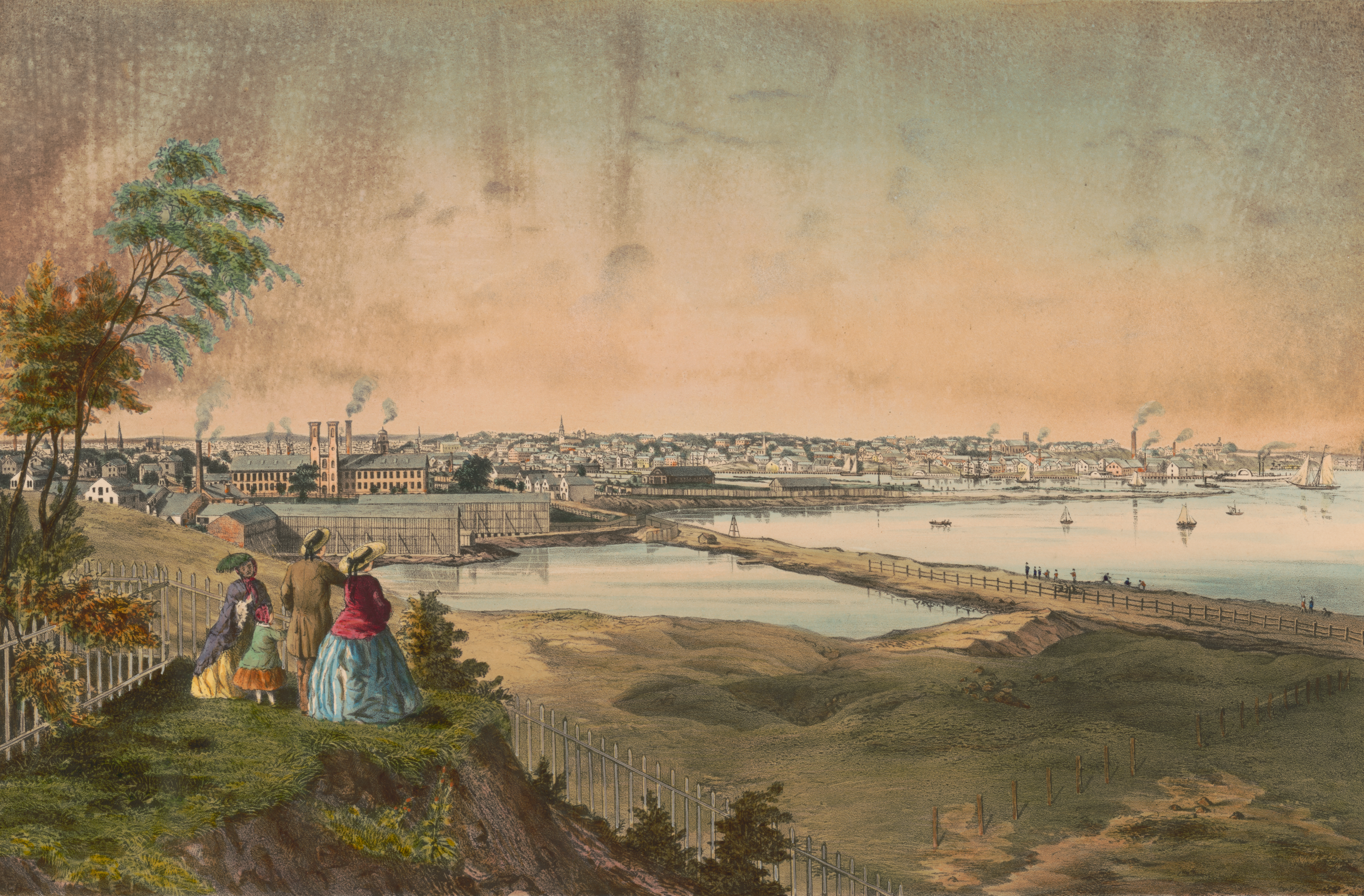
Providence, harbor view, 1858

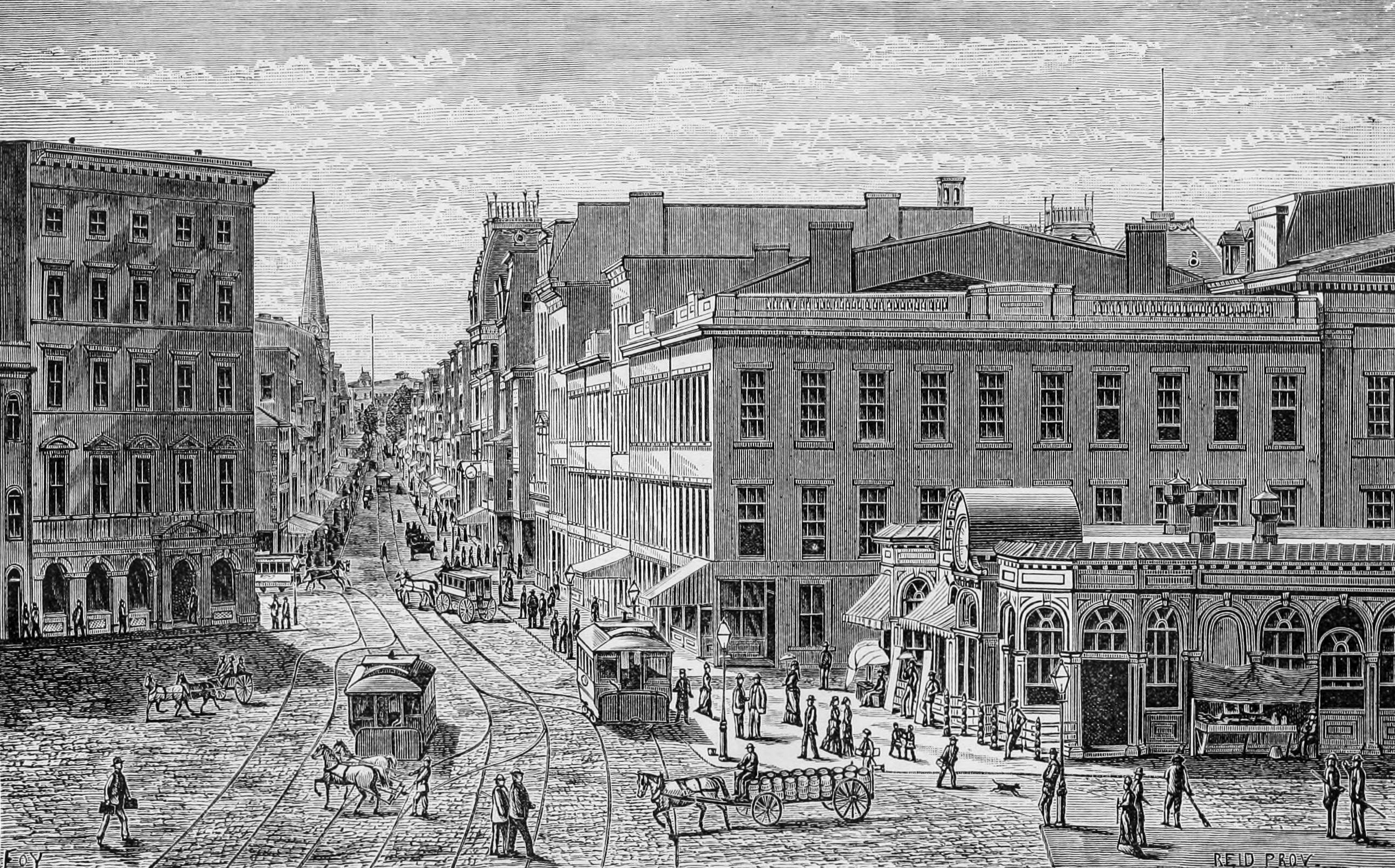
A 19th century view of Westminster Street.

=== Growth ===
Providence experienced considerable growth during the late 1800s, with immigrants increasing the population from 54,595 in 1865 to 175,597 by 1900.

In 1871, Betsey Williams, the last descendant of Roger Williams, bequeathed 102 acres of land to the city for the development of Roger Williams Park. The elaborately landscaped grounds were designed by Horace Cleveland and intended to serve as an escape for the workers of the industrial, urban center of Providence, in accordance with the ideas of the City Beautiful movement.

By 1890, Providence's Union Railroad had a network which included more than 300 horsecars and 1,515 horses. Two years later, the first electric streetcars were introduced in Providence, and the city soon had an electric streetcar network extending from Crescent Park to Pawtuxet in the south and Pawtucket in the north. According to journalist Mike Stanton, "Providence was one of the richest cities in America in the early 1900s."

Increased population density caused public health problems; in 1854, an epidemic of cholera swept the city. A survey of living conditions conducted by the city discovered unhealthy crowding among immigrants and workers. In one case, 29 people were recorded as living in a single-story house; in another, 47 people shared a two-story home. The survey found 5,780 latrines in the city, of which "fewer than half were emptied annually". 1854 was remembered as "The Year of Cholera" for the next 30 years.

=== Sole capital ===
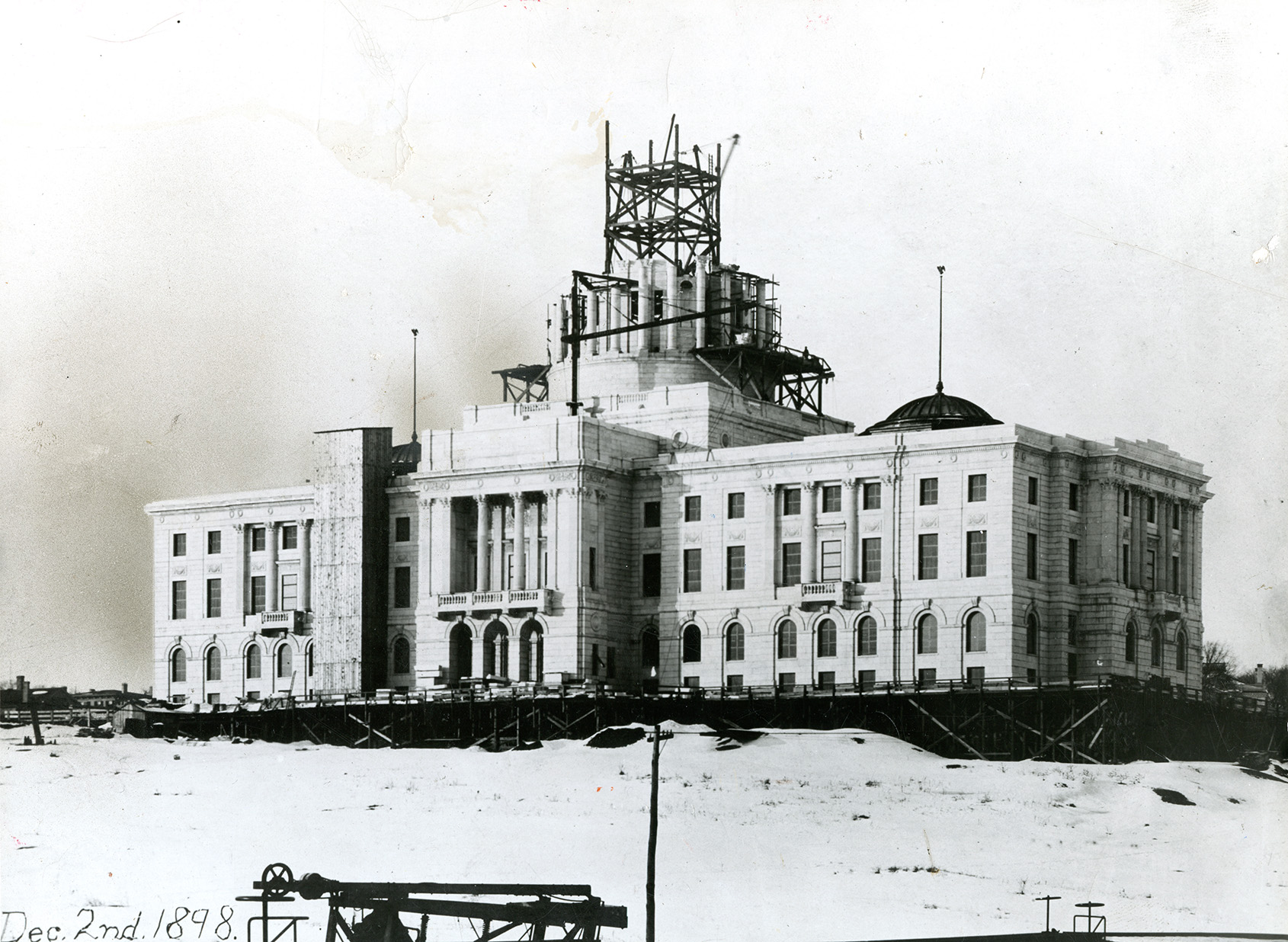
Construction on the Rhode Island State House, 1898.

The Rhode Island General Assembly rotated among a number of legislative buildings throughout the Colony of Rhode Island and Providence Plantations. In 1900, the assembly passed the Article of Amendment XI, making Providence the state's sole capital and the legislature's permanent home. This designation was concurrent with the construction of the Rhode Island State House, which was completed in 1904.

== Early 20th century ==
=== An "industrial wonder" ===
At the start of the 20th century, Providence had grown to become one of the ten largest industrial centers of the United States. Providence ranked first nationally in per capita wealth. Its Board of Trade boasted of what it called the Five Industrial Wonders of the World: Brown & Sharpe, the world's largest tool factory; Nicholson File, the world's largest file factory; American Screw, the world's largest screw factory; Gorham, the world's largest silverware factory; and Corliss, the world's largest engine factory. The city was also first in the nation for production of jewelry and woolen and worsted textiles, and third in production of base metals.

In 1914, a series of civil disturbances known as the Macaroni Riots broke out in the city's Federal Hill neighborhood where several hundred Italian Americans protested against an increase in the price of pasta products in the city.

=== Influenza outbreak ===
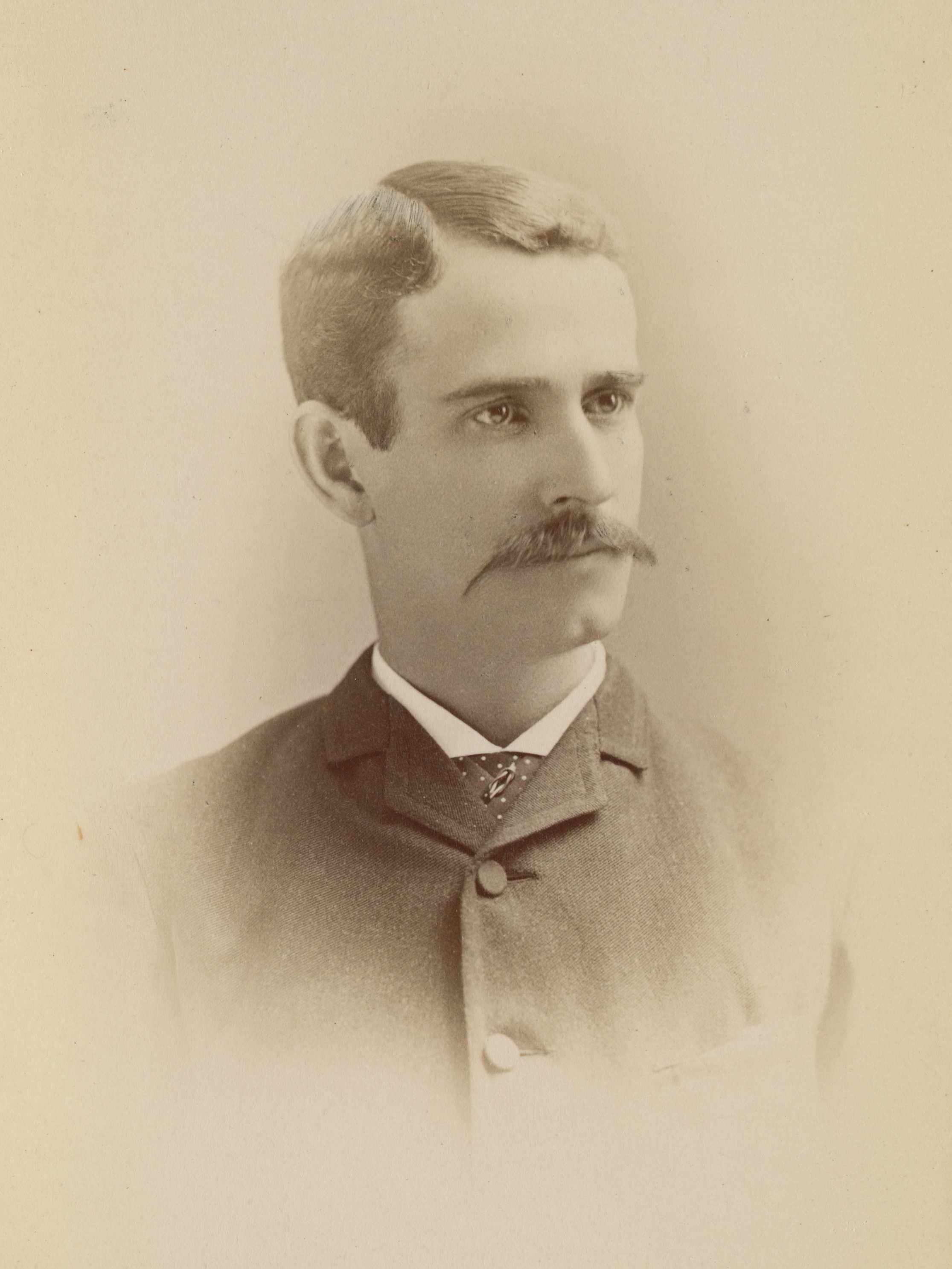
Charles Value Chapin was a pioneer in public health who oversaw Providence's response to the Spanish flu

In early September 1918, the first cases of the Spanish flu started appearing in Providence. By the end of the month, public health superintendent Charles V. Chapin had identified over 2,500 cases in the city. Chapin and other officials responded by ordering more hospital beds and increased staffing. On October 6, the Providence Board of Health issued a general closure order, affecting all public and private schools, theaters, movie houses, and dance halls. The spread of the influenza reached its highest level during October 3–9, with 6,700 cases reported. The closure order was rescinded on October 25. The flu returned for a smaller second wave in January 1919, which hit schools particularly hard. By February 5, no new cases were being reported and the epidemic was declared over.

=== Early decline ===
The city began to see a decline by the mid-1920s as manufacturing industries began to shut down. In 1922, it was affected by the 1922 New England Textile Strike, shutting down the mills in the city over an attempted wage cut and hours increase.

The city was deeply affected by the Great Depression, which left more than a third of the labor force unemployed. The subsequent Recession of 1937–1938 was immediately followed by the New England Hurricane of 1938, which flooded the city's downtown. The hurricane was particularly destructive to the struggling textile industry, with many mills never reopening following the storm.

== Mid-late 20th century ==
=== Urban decline ===
From the 1940s to 1970s, middle class residents vacated Providence faster than any other American city other than Detroit. The remainder of these residents were disproportionately poor and elderly.

Starting in 1956, construction began on Interstate 195 and Interstate 95, which necessitated the demolition of hundreds of homes and dozens of businesses. These highways ultimately severed Downtown from the South Side, the West End, Federal Hill, and Smith Hill. Over the following years, the Providence Redevelopment Authority further razed a number of blocks west of Downtown in an unsuccessful effort to attract investment.

=== Decline of downtown ===
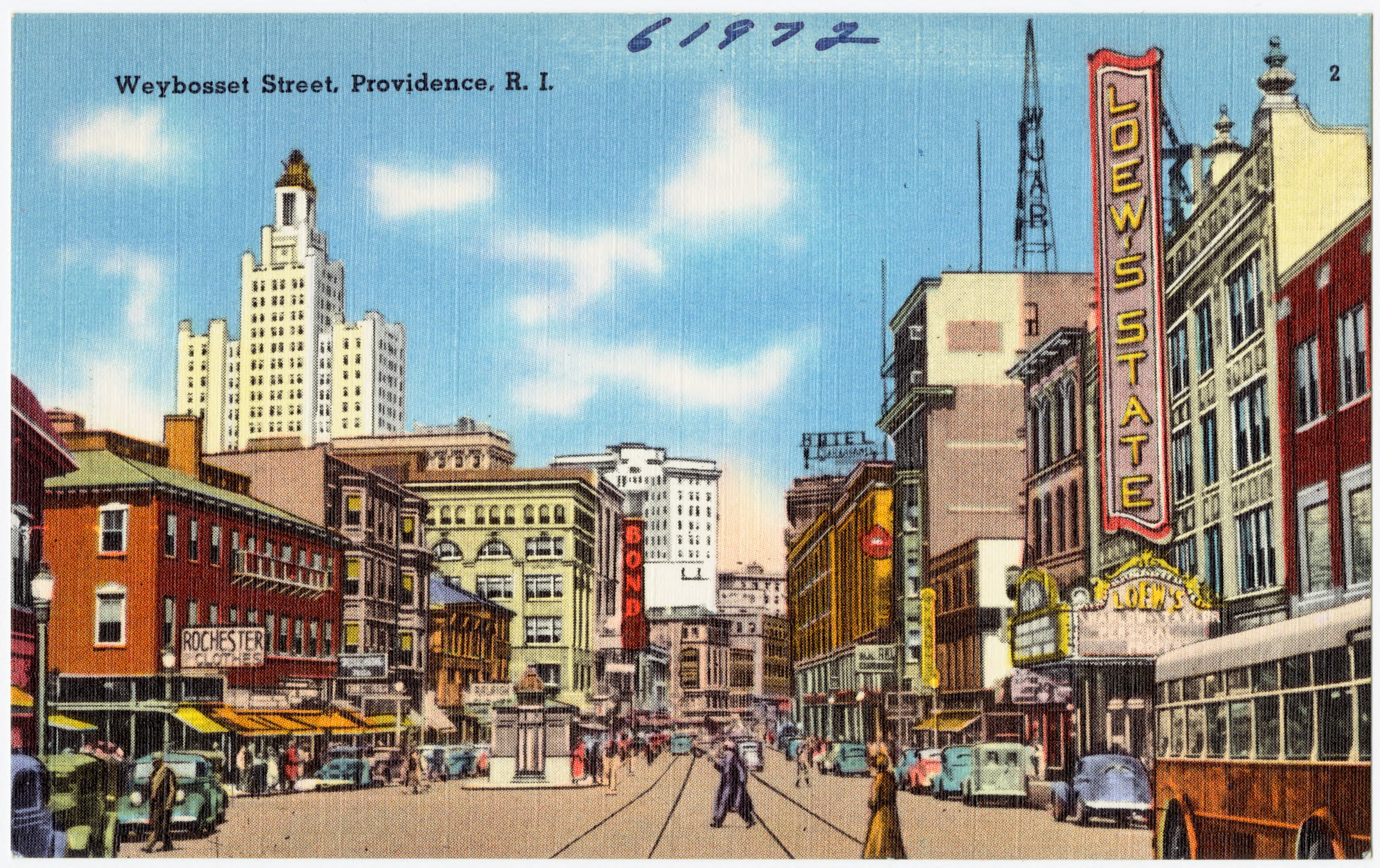
A postcard showing a Providence streetscape c. 1940, when the city reached its maximum population.

Providence's population decreased from a maximum of 253,504 in 1940 to only 179,213 in 1970, as the middle class fled to the suburbs. Those who stayed behind were disproportionately poor and in need of social services. Retail stores, movie theaters, and businesses likewise fled as Providence's downtown was widely considered polluted, dangerous to visit after dark, and lacking in parking. As hotels and department stores failed, many significant downtown buildings were demolished, boarded up, or abandoned. In 1964, Westminster Street was pedestrianized in a failed attempt to attract shoppers; within a decade, all the street's major stores had closed except Woolworth's. Familiar local names disappeared from the city by the end of the 1970s, such as the Crown Hotel, Kent Hotel, Narragansett Hotel, Dreyfus Hotel, Arcadia Ballroom, Albee Theater, Port Arthur Chinese Restaurant, J.J. Newbury's, Kresge's, Gladdings, and Shepard's Department Store.

=== Crime ===
From the 1950s to the 1980s, Providence was a notorious bastion of organized crime. Notorious mafia boss Raymond L.S. Patriarca ruled a vast criminal enterprise from the city for over three decades, during which murders and kidnappings became commonplace.

=== "Renaissance City" ===
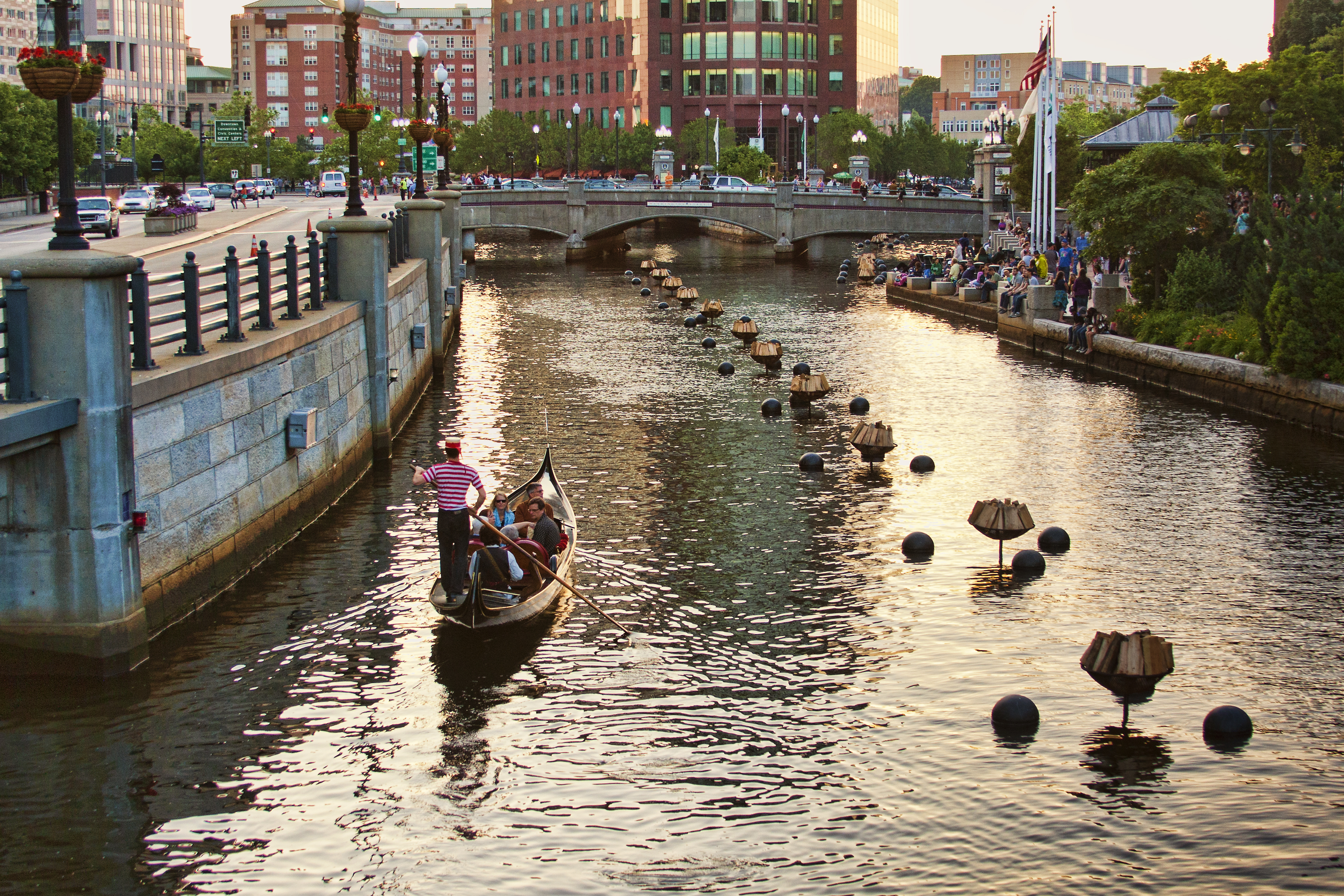
The Providence River as it appears now; the river was largely paved over until the 1980s

During the late 1970s and early 1980s, $606 million of local and national Community Development money was invested throughout the city, and the declining population began to stabilize.

In the 1990s, Mayor Buddy Cianci advertised the city's arts and promoted further revitalization. Cianci's administration uncovered parts of the city's previously paved rivers, relocated a large section of railroad underground, created Waterplace Park and river walks, and constructed the 1.4 million square-foot Providence Place Mall.

In 1980, Providence's decreasing population began to grow once again.

== 21st century ==
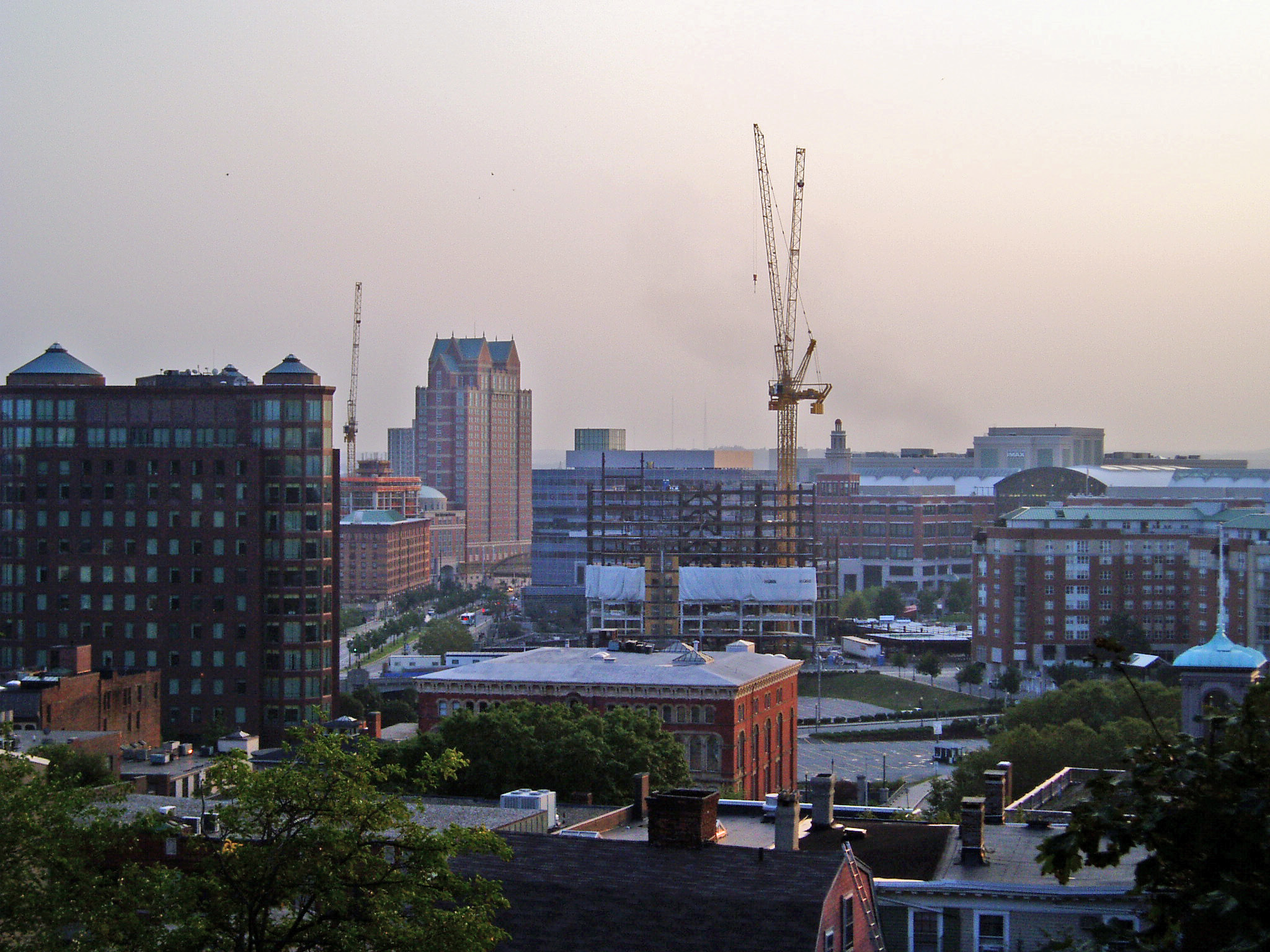
New construction in Providence (August 2006): cranes seen for Waterplace Towers Condominium, Westin addition, and the GTECH Corporation headquarters prior to completion.

=== First decades ===
From the mid 2000s to early 2010s, the city of Providence worked to relocate portions of Interstate 95 and 195, with the intention of reunifying formerly divided neighborhoods on the city's West Side. The project cost more than $620 million but freed 19 acres of land in and adjacent to the city's Jewelry District. The city and state have marketed the new neighborhood as Providence's "Innovation & Design District," with the intention of establishing the area as a science, technology, and education hub and cementing the city's knowledge economy.

During the 2000s and early 2010s, new investment was triggered in the city with new construction, including numerous condominium and hotel projects and a new office high rise. The city recruited a number of companies including Virgin Pulse and GE Digital to establish offices in Providence, offering tax incentives and advertising a lower cost of living than nearby Boston.

=== Ongoing challenges ===
Poverty remains a problem in Providence, with 26 percent of the city living below the federal poverty line. A 2020 Brandeis University report claimed that the "opportunity gap" between white and Latino children in Providence was the third-highest of the 100 cities considered in the study.

From 2004 to 2005, Providence had the highest rise in median housing price of any city in the United States.

=== Bicycle and pedestrian initiatives ===
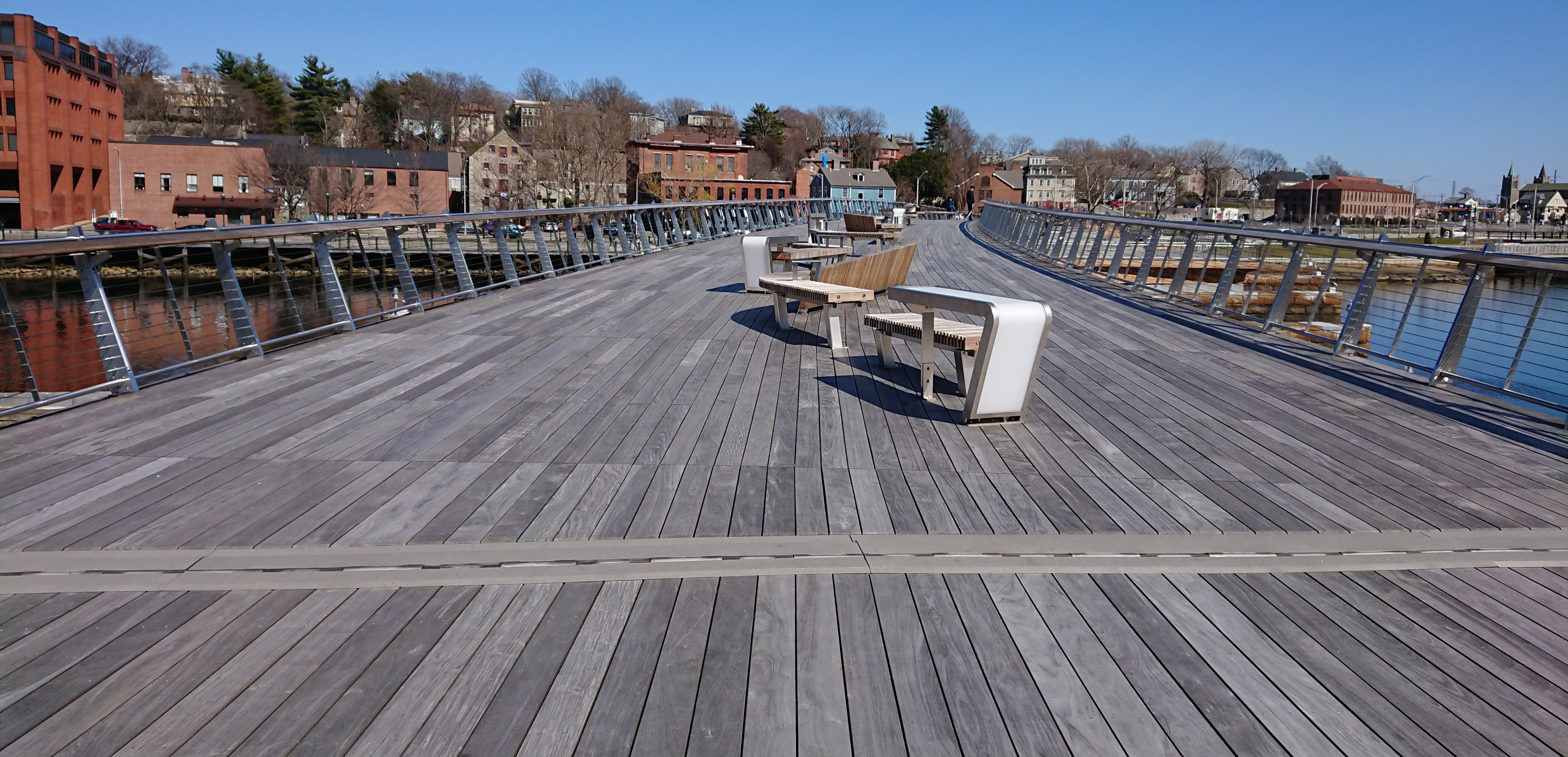
The Michael S. Van Leesten Memorial Bridge, opened 2020

The late 2010s saw a number of bicycle and pedestrian infrastructure improvements. A greenway opened in Roger Williams Park in 2017. In August 2019, the Providence River Pedestrian and Bicycle Bridge opened, connecting the east and west sides of downtown. The bridge was built on the granite piers of the old Route 195 bridge.

A bicycle sharing program started in September 2018, only to be halted within a year due to vandalism and theft.

In January 2020, mayor Jorge Elorza introduced a "Great Streets" initiative to create a framework of public space improvements to encourage walking, riding bicycles, and using public transit. The plan includes establishing an "Urban Trail Network" which includes 60 miles of bicycle paths, bike lanes, and greenways within Providence.

== See also ==
- Timeline of Providence, Rhode Island
- List of newspapers in Rhode Island in the 18th century: Providence
- List of mayors of Providence, Rhode Island

== Notes ==
=== Sources ===
- Clark-Pujara, Christy (2018). Dark Work: The Business of Slavery in Rhode Island. New York University Press. ISBN 978-1-4798-5563-6. Project MUSE book 49199.
