= Hard Scrabble and Snow Town =

Hard Scrabble
- Former neighborhood
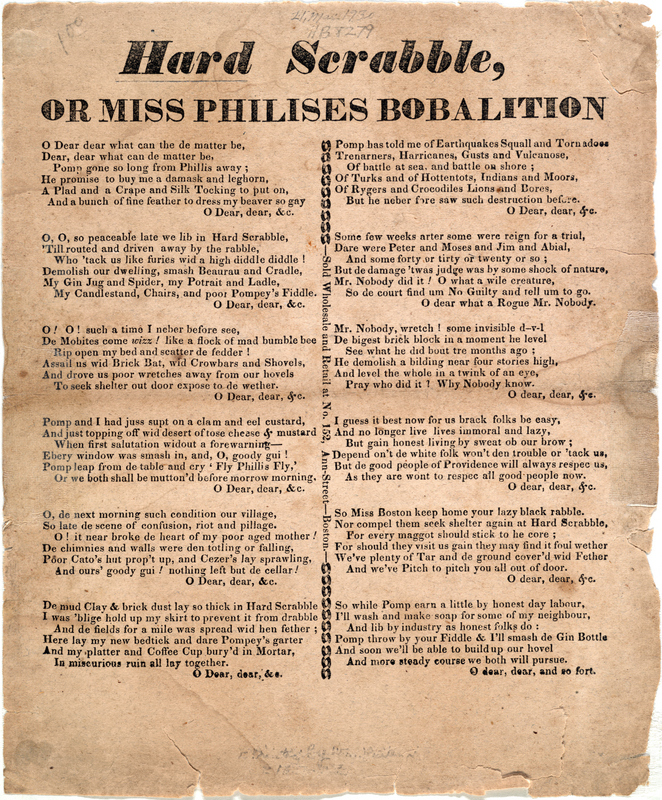
- Broadside ridiculing victims of the 1824 Hard Scrabble riot and promising similar treatment to other immigrants settling in the city

- Location within Rhode Island
- Coordinates: 41.8325°N 71.4111°W
- Country: United States
- State: Rhode Island
- City: Providence
- Established: circa 1800

Hard Scrabble (Addison Hollow) and Snow Town were two neighborhoods located in Providence, Rhode Island in the nineteenth century. They were the sites of race riots in which working-class white residents destroyed multiple black homes and businesses in 1824 and 1831, respectively.

== Hard Scrabble ==
Hard Scrabble was a predominantly black neighborhood in northwestern Providence in the early 19th century. Away from the town center, its inexpensive rents attracted working class free blacks, poor people of all races and marginalized businesses such as saloons and houses of prostitution. It was perceived by many white neighbors as a blight on the town. Tensions developed between the residents of Hard Scrabble and other residents of Providence. Hard Scrabble was one of several similar neighborhoods in urban centers in the Northeast where free blacks gathered to further themselves socially and economically. Other African American communities created in cities with growing job markets in the same time period include the northern slope of Boston’s Beacon Hill, Little Liberia in Bridgeport, Connecticut and Sandy Ground on New York's Staten Island.

On October 18, 1824, a brawl started in the neighborhood after a black man refused to get off the sidewalk when approached by some whites. The following evening a mob of white residents attacked the homes and businesses of Black residents while many more looked on. Eyewitness accounts describe between 40 and 60 people actively tearing apart homes, some armed with axes and clubs. In total approximately 20 buildings were destroyed by the rioters. The Violence lasted from between 7pm and around 2 or 3am when the rioters voted to adjourn.

=== Trial of the rioters ===
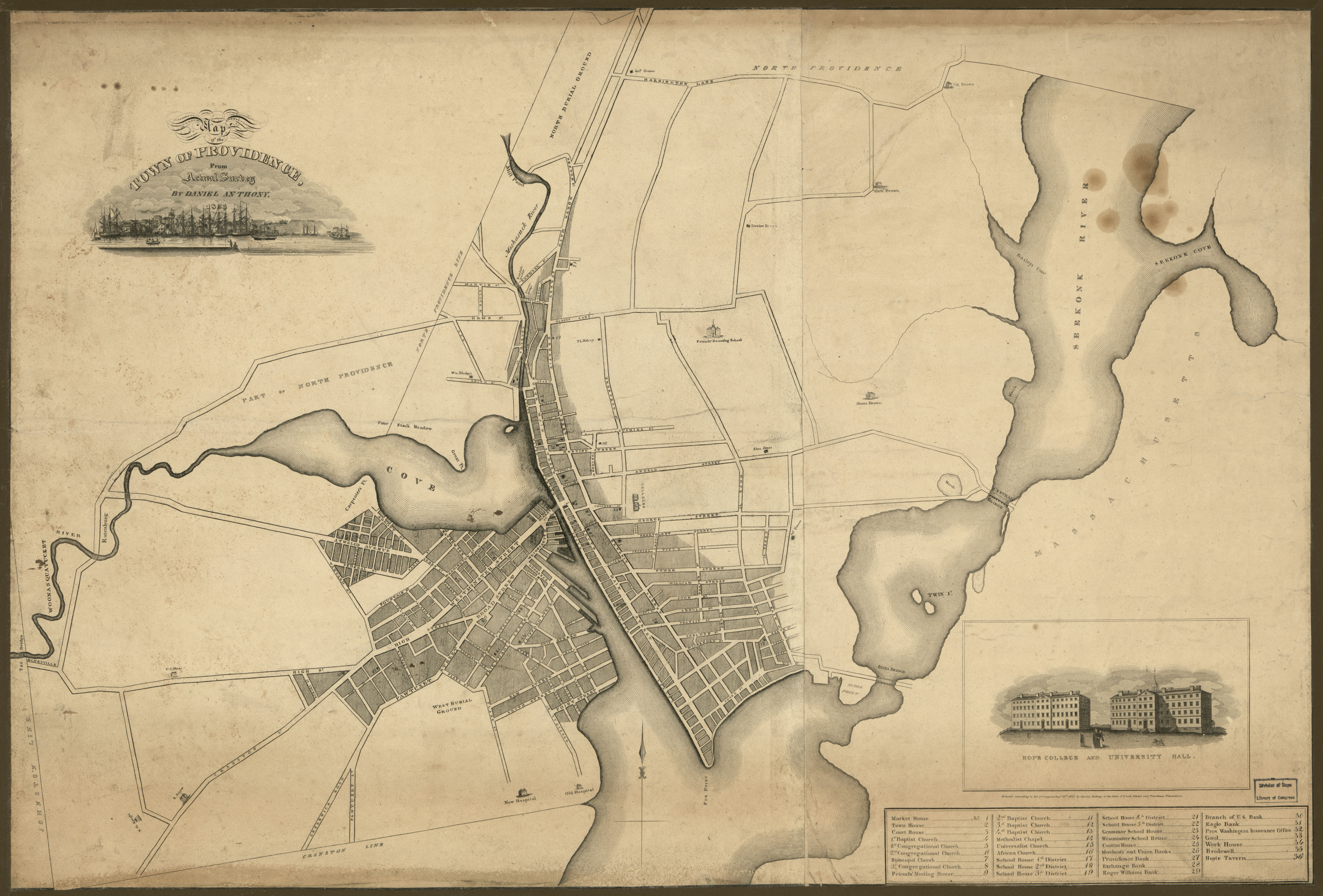
Map of Providence in 1823, one year before the Hard Scrabble Riot.

The Trial took place in November 1824 under the direction of Chief Justice Thomas Mann. Of the at least 40 rioters present only 8 were identified charged for the crime: Oliver Cummins, Joseph Butler Jr., Nathaniel G. Metcalf, Amos Chaffee, John Sherman, Gilbert Humes, Arthur Farrier, James Gibbs, Ezra Hubbard, and William Taylor. Sherman and Taylor were not apprehended, not having been found by the Sheriff. Council for the Defense was Welcome A. Burges and Joseph L. Tillinghast. They argued that witness testimony was unreliable, that the defendants could not be tied to the scene of the crime, that the common law definition of a riot had been superseded by a stricter Rhode Island statute and thus did not apply, and that the destruction of Hard Scrabble had been a just and necessary endeavor. In his closing arguments for the defense of Oliver Cummins, Tillinghast compared the riots to the destruction of Babylon in the Bible. Of the 8 defendants only Metcalf and Farrier were found guilty, though these verdicts were swiftly overturned.

== Snow Town ==
After the Hard Scrabble riot, the Snow Town neighborhood began nearby. It was another interracial neighborhood where free blacks and poor whites lived among crime and marginal businesses. Evidence points to its location being where the Rhode Island State House is today, along both sides of Smith Street. Like Hard Scrabble it had a reputation as a den of vice and violence and was seen as a blight on the town with calls for it to be torn down. It and the older neighborhood of Olney's Lane (now modern day Olney Street) were the targets of another series of riots in September 1831. In total Eight Buildings on Olney's Lane and Nine in Snow Town were destroyed.

=== September 21 ===
The riot started the night of September 21, when a group of five white sailors went looking for trouble around Olney's Lane. A crowd had begun to form after an apparent brawl between several other white sailors and Black residents. Led by the five white sailors the crowd advanced up the street. It is unknown who started throwing stones first, but both sides began to fight until a shot was fired. After the shot the main body of the crowd retreated down the hill but the sailors remained and continued up the lane where another shot was fired, this time hitting one of the men. The gunman was a Black resident defending his home near the top of the lane, who told the 5 men to withdraw, and is quoted as saying "Is this the way for blacks to live, to be obliged to defend themselves from stones?" The sailors refused, one calling out "Fire and be Damned." Several more shots were fired, though it is unclear from the official record who fired them. One of the sailors was mortally wounded and died later that night, while two others were wounded. They retreated back to the bottom of the lane where the crowd had grown into a mob. Incensed, the mob began to tear down the houses along the lane, demolishing 2 houses and breaking the windows and furniture of several others.

=== September 22 ===
News of the Previous night's riot spread quickly throughout the city. More attacks on Olney Street were threatened. The Sheriff's office took note of this and stepped in, sending several officers and the Sheriff himself to Olney Street. By 7pm a mob had formed at the base of the street. Multiple times they were ordered to disperse and seven people were arrested. The rioters clashed several times with the constables, reportedly stopping work destroying homes to prevent the sheriff arresting any further rioters. Outnumbered, the sheriff sent a request to governor Lemuel Hastings Arnold around 9 or 10 pm requesting support from the Rhode Island Militia. Around 12am 25 members of the First Light Infantry led by Captain Shaw arrived at the lane. This did nothing to stop the rioters who continued to throw stones and weapons at the police and soldiers. The Governor and Sheriff determined that "nothing short of firing would produce any other effect than increased irritation and ferocity of the mob." The Soldiers retreated, and again the Governor and Sheriff demanded the rioters to disperse to no avail. Several soldiers reported minor injuries. 6 more homes along Olney Lane were destroyed. Around 1am the mob moved on to Snow Town where another 2 homes were destroyed and several others vandalized. Around 3 or 4 in the morning they disbanded.

=== September 23 ===
There were several reports that an attempt to break the 7 people arrested the previous night out of jail would occur. In response the sheriff requested further support from the Rhode Island Militia and was granted it. Members of the Dragoons, Artillery, Cadets, and Volunteers were all put on alert alongside the First Light Infantry at 6pm. 4 of the 7 prisoners were let go due to lack of evidence, and the others had trials scheduled but were discharged as matter of right. Despite all 7 no longer being held, a small mob of between 30 and 50 gathered at the town jail to demand their immediate release. Upon learning that the prisoners had been released the majority of the crowd dispersed, some going to Snow Town to continue the last night's violence, though in the official report there is no note of what happened there. The Militia was dismissed at 12am that night.

=== September 24 ===
Again the Militia was put on alert at 6pm. Around 8:30pm the Sheriff reported that a mob had gathered around Smith's Bridge (probably the modern intersection between Smith and Canal Streets). The Violence started soon after, apparently so loud that it could be heard by most of the city. The militia was immediately called into action, accompanied by the Governor and the Sheriff, along with several other magistrates, taking position on the brow of Smith Hill. The Mob stopped their destruction and focused entirely on the soldiers. Several times the rioters were ordered to disperse. Several small fights between soldiers and rioters broke out when a rioter attempted to grab the musket of a private, starting a small brawl. The Sheriff gave an ultimatum: 5 minutes for the riot to disband or they would shoot, the safety of rioters and onlookers would not be guaranteed. This was met by more cries of "Fire and be Damned." After trying everything short of firing into the crowd, the Sheriff called for the First Light Infantry and the Dragoons to push into the riot to disperse them but this too failed, and the Militia was forced to retreat back down Smith Street. The mob followed and grew more and more violent as the Soldiers moved towards the bridge. Unable to easily move and under immense threat, the Sheriff ordered the 1st Light Infantry to Fire into the crowd. four rioters were killed in the volley, and the rest began to disband as the Militia continued down Canal Street. The Militia gathered at the Court House and remained there on guard until the morning.

== Political fallout ==
The Hard Scrabble Riot had engendered little media sympathy for its victims. The outcome of the trial and the broadsides published about the event depicted the event as at worst a necessary evil, and at best a righteous act. Beyond the trial little attention was paid to the riot. But by the time of the Snow Town riot, leading citizens and journalists took the problem far more seriously. Most took a similar tact to the coverage of Hard Scrabble, decrying black residents, especially focusing on those who had shot at the 5 sailors on the first day of the riot. Alongside this was support for the actions of the police and militia for the reestablishment of order. The Day after the riots ended the City government held a meeting at on the steps of the town house, addressing the violence that had occurred and the state's response and appointed a Special Committee to write a report on the riots. After the Snow Town riot, written opinion approved of suppressing rioters to maintain order, and Providence voters approved a charter for a city government containing strong police powers.

== Location and memorialization ==
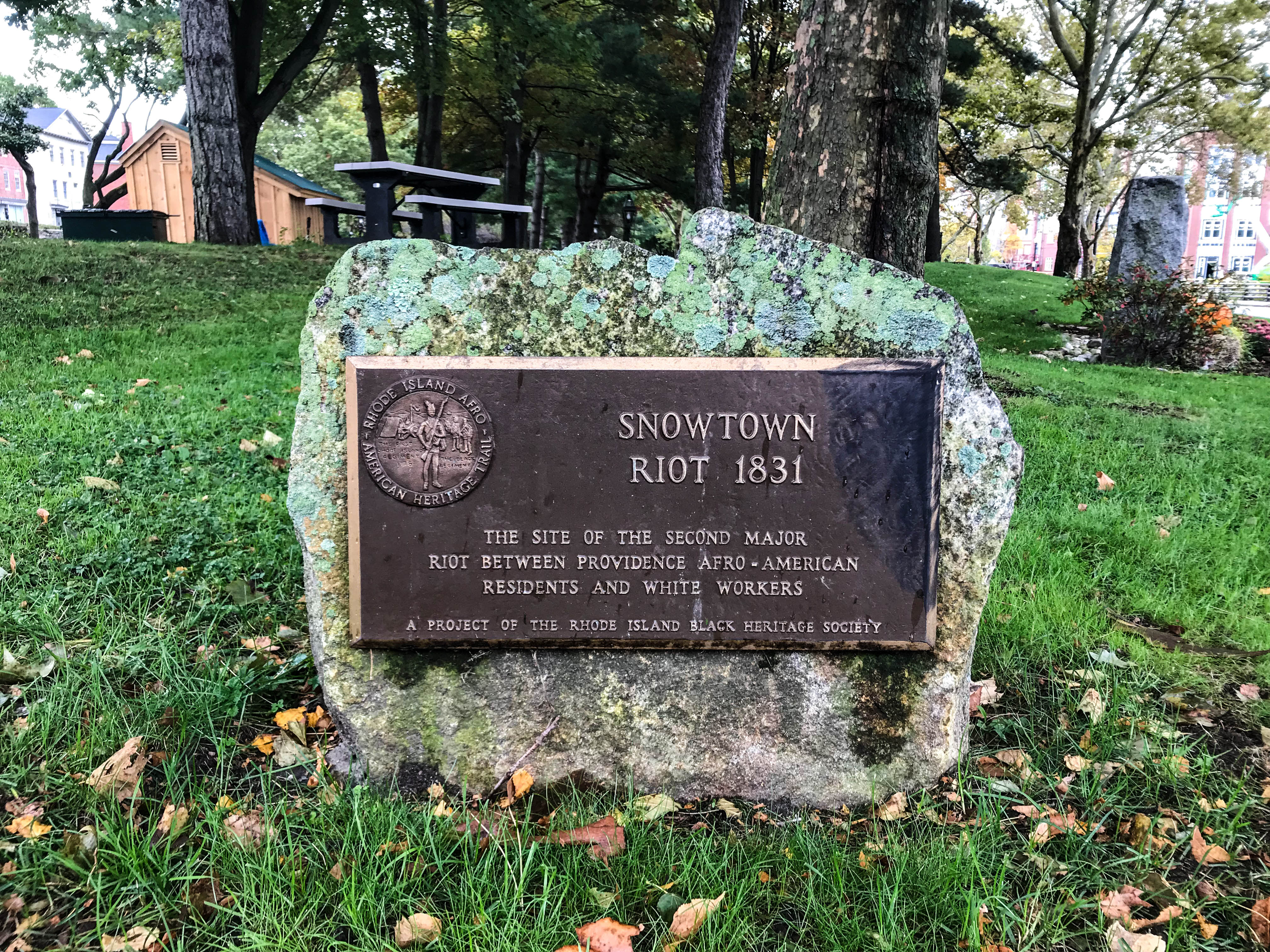
A memorial plaque in the Roger Williams National Memorial, erected by the Rhode Island Black Heritage Society

The exact location of the Hard Scrabble and Snow Town neighborhoods within northwestern Providence has been a matter of some dispute, which complicated efforts to memorialize Hard Scrabble. Partly this is due to the neighborhoods being poorly recorded in state records. From the records of the riot, Hardscrabble may have stood around the corner of Smith Street and North Main street, though other theories have been suggested. In 2006, a memorial plaque was installed in a grass-covered traffic island at the corner of North Main and Canal Streets near the State House. This plaque has since been moved to Francis Street south of Gaspee Street as of 2024.

Snow Town was located on Smith Hill where the State Capital and the Providence Train Station sit today. Several buildings that belonged to the neighborhood still stood during the Capital's construction, though all have since been torn down. A memorial for the Snow Town riot is located nearby at the Roger Williams National Memorial.

== See also ==
- History of Providence, Rhode Island
