= Newport, Rhode Island =

City in Rhode Island, United States

Newport
- City
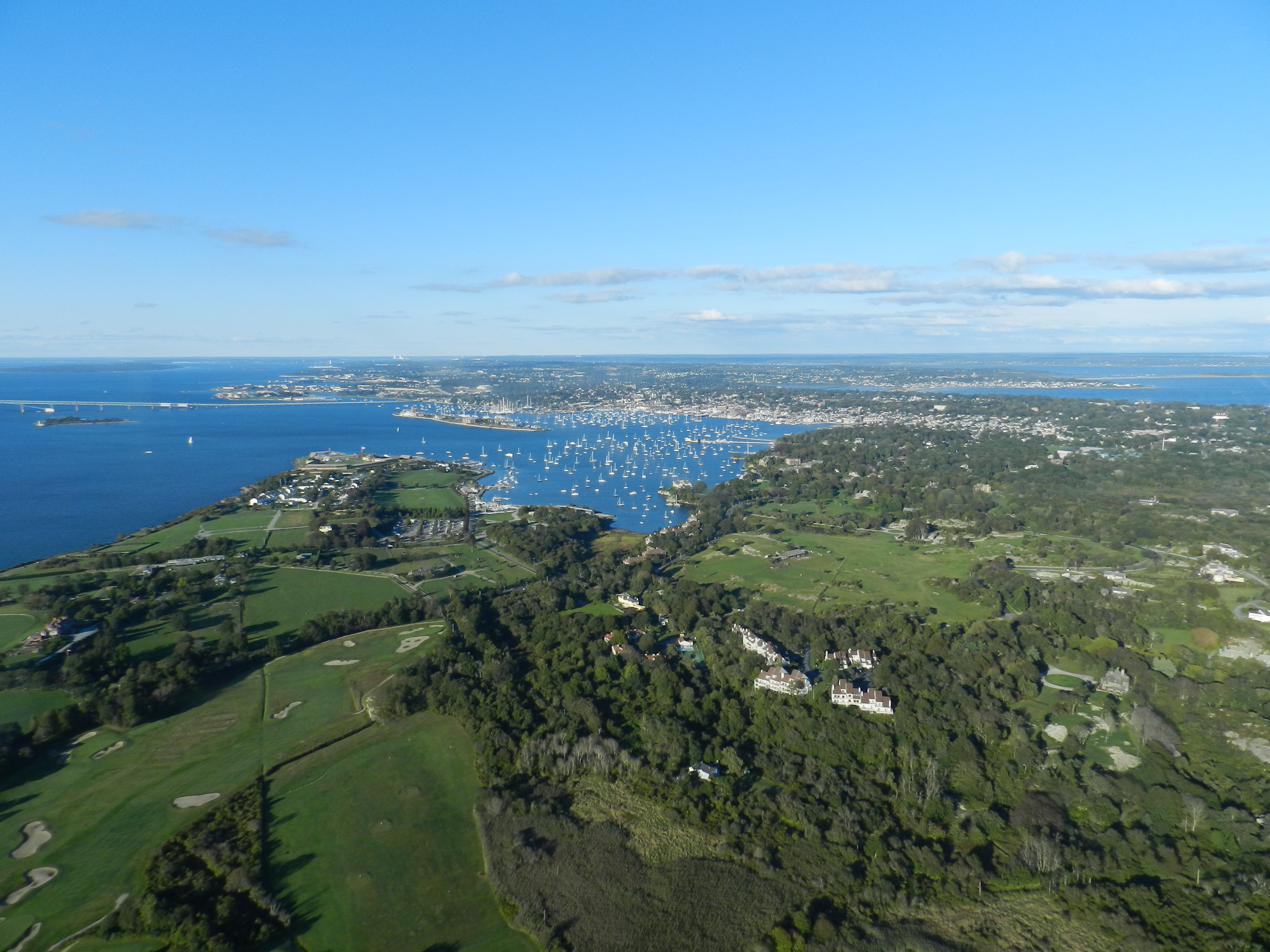
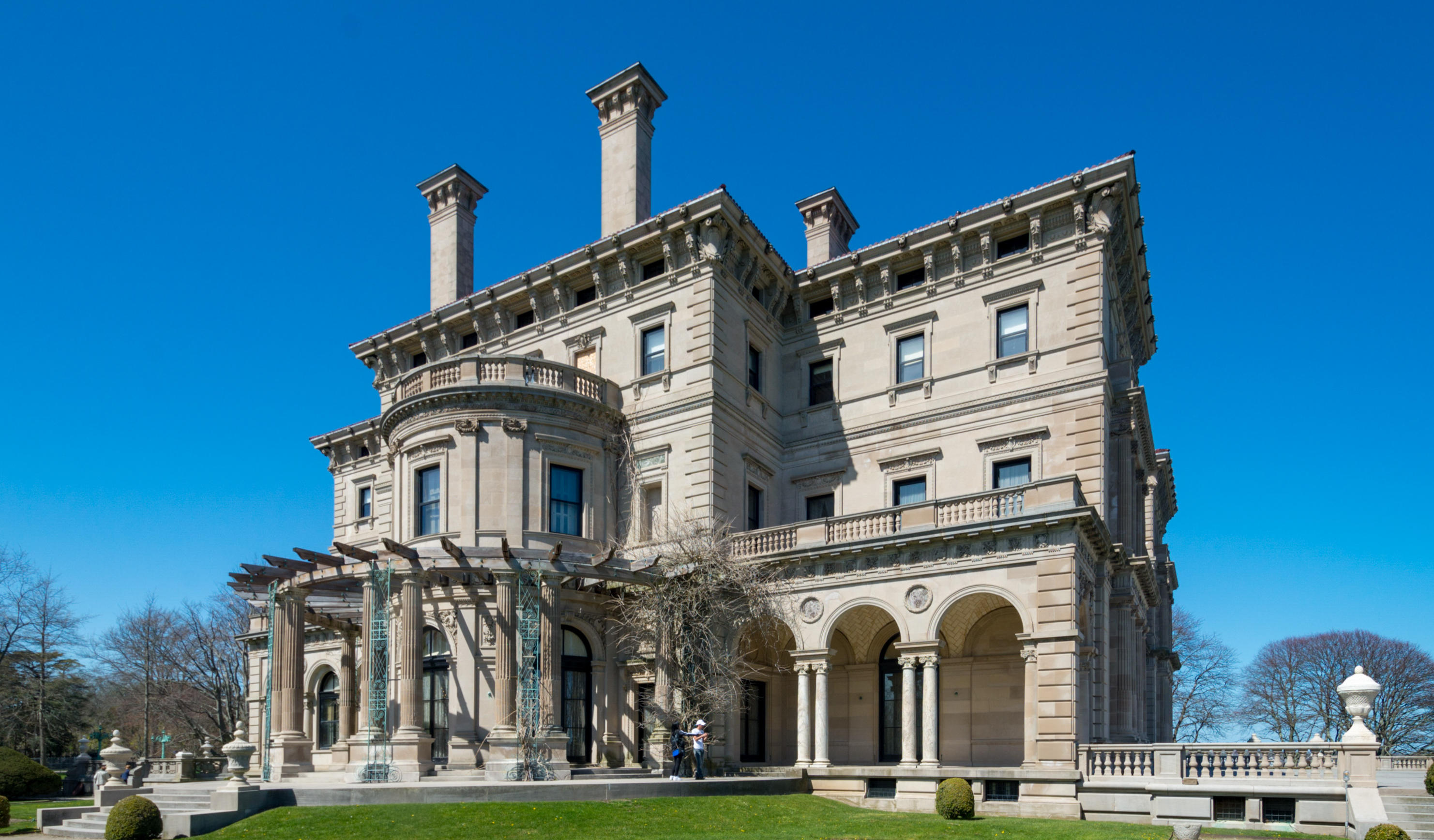
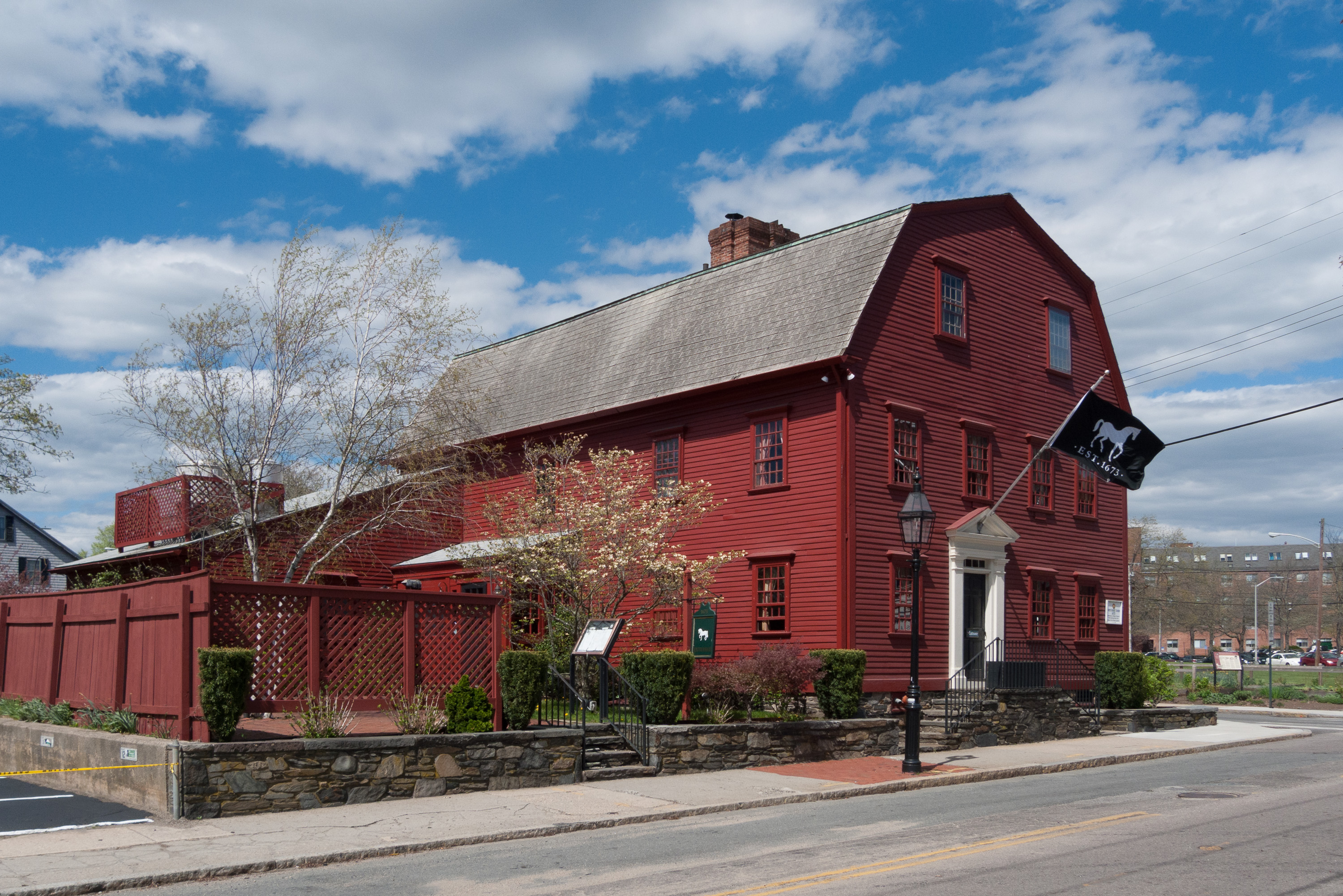
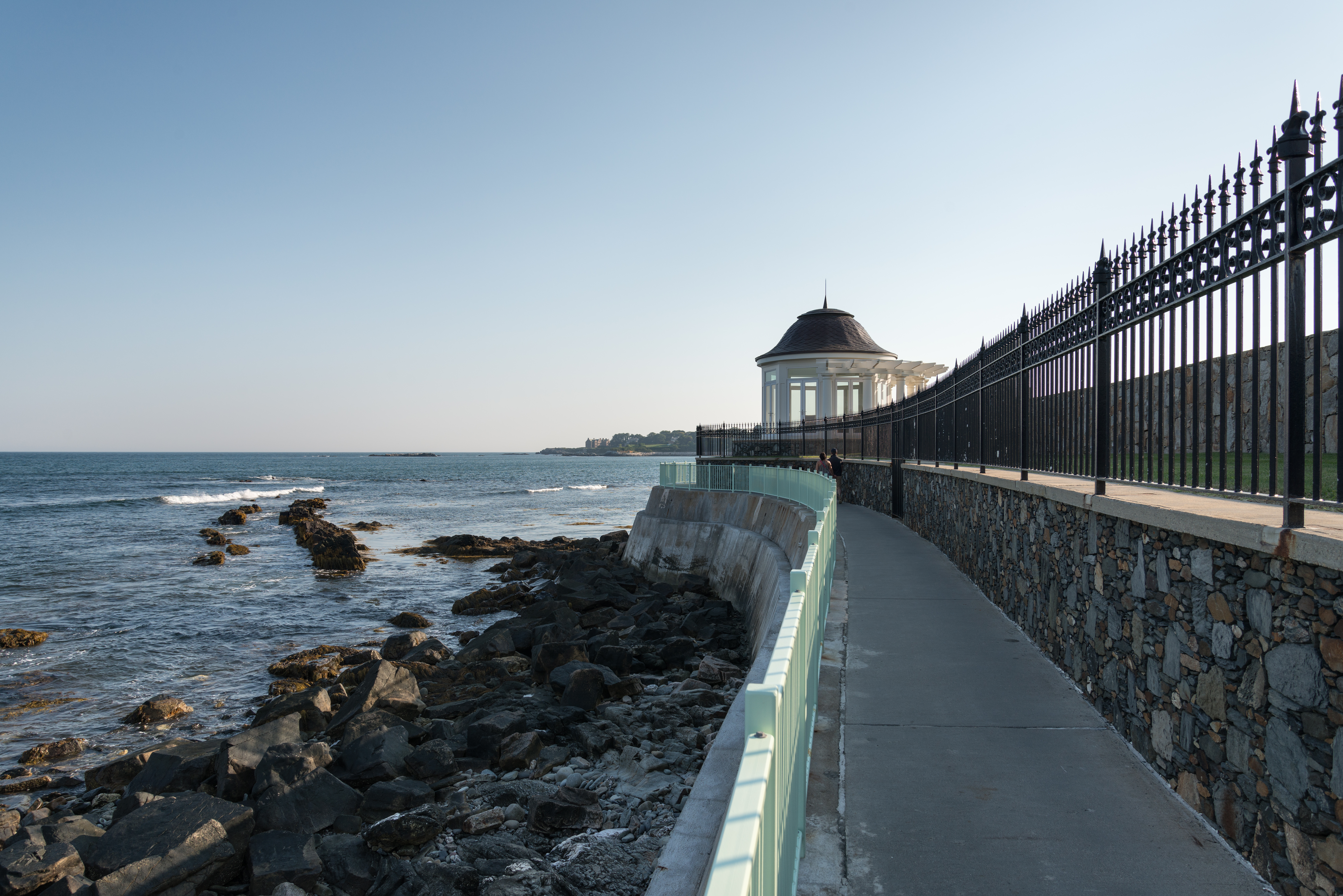
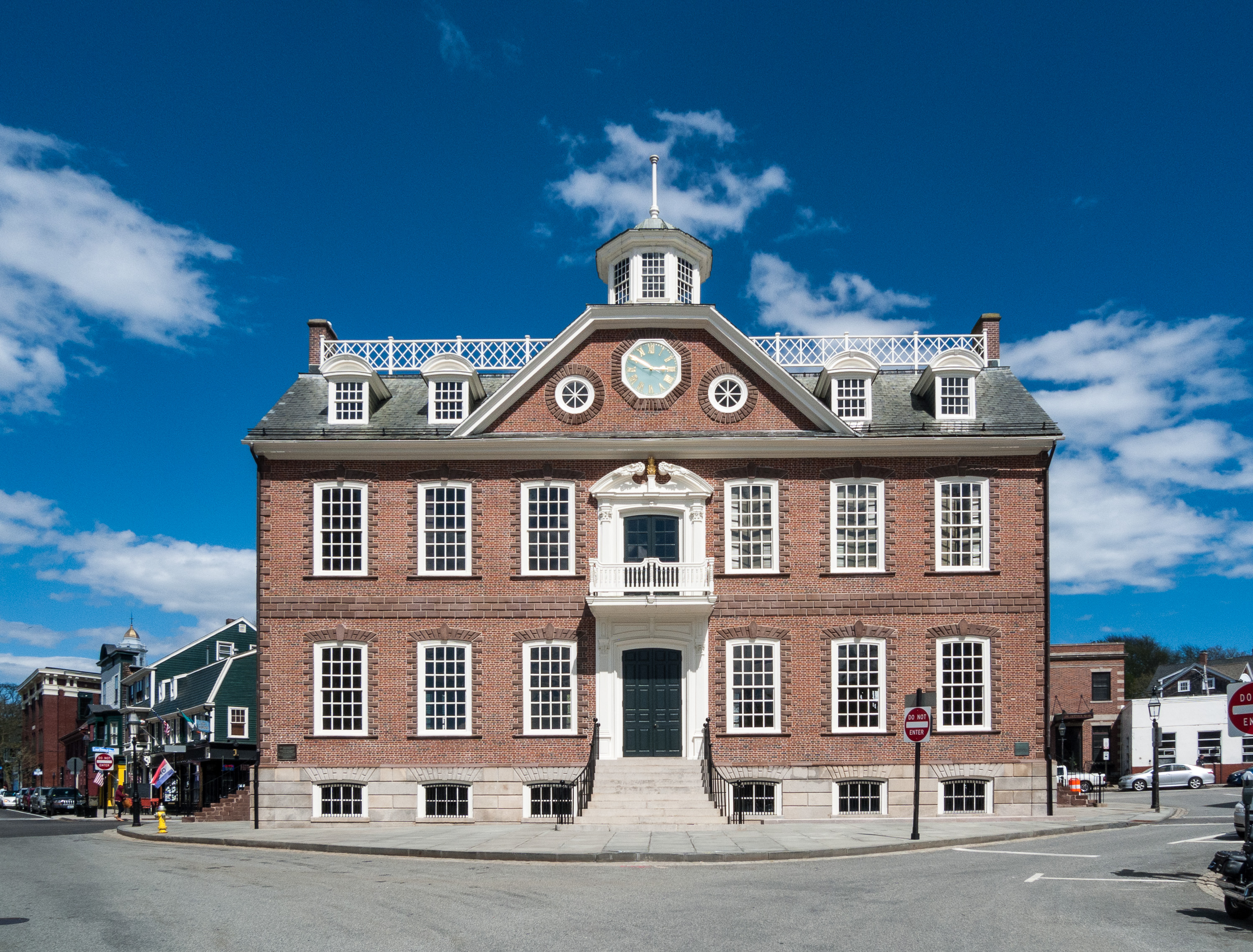
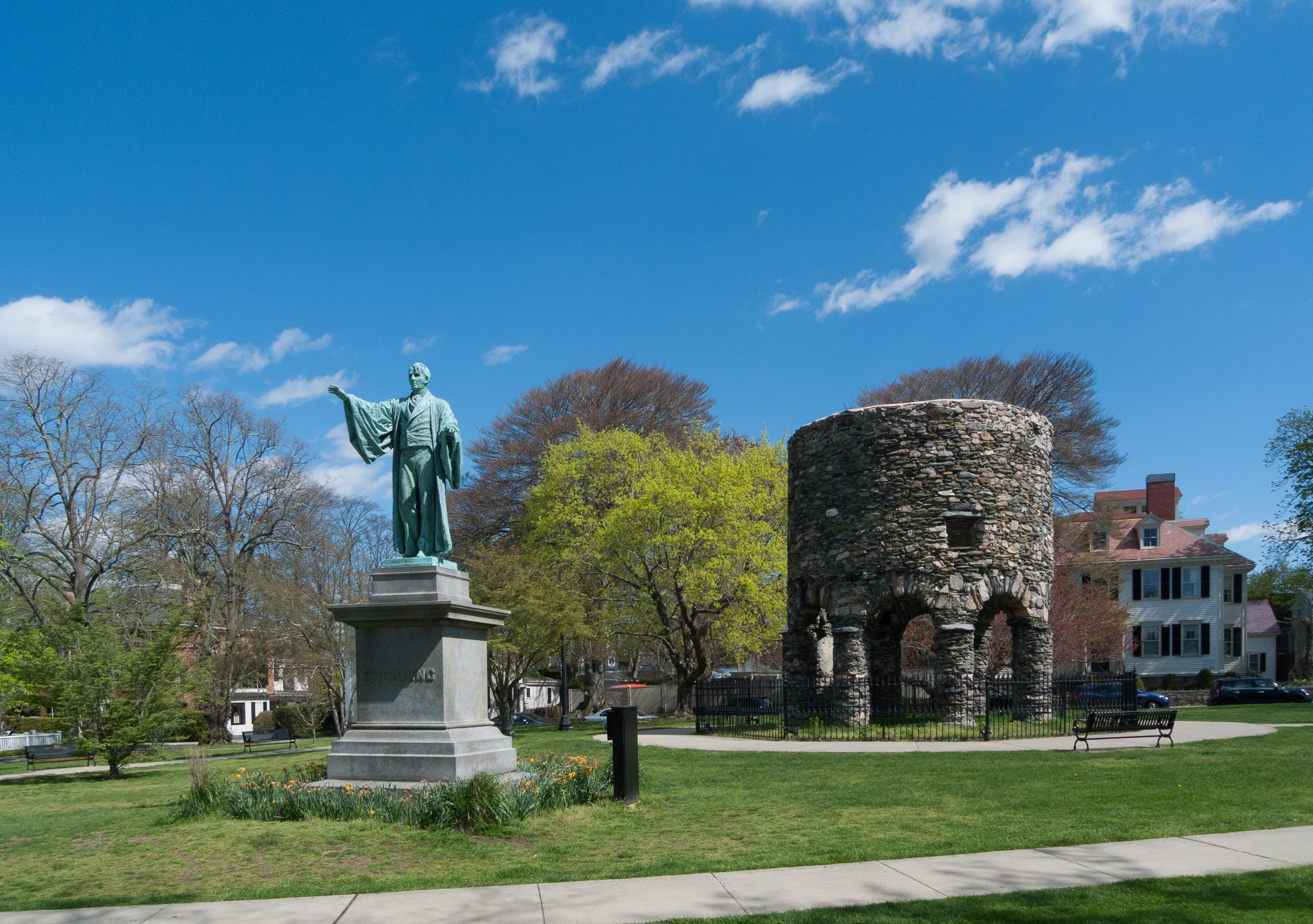
- From top, left to right: Newport Harbor, The Breakers, White Horse Tavern, Cliff Walk, Old Colony House, Newport Tower

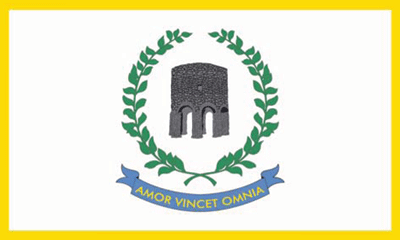
- Flag Seal Logo
- Nicknames: City by the Sea; Sailing Capital of the World; Queen of Summer Resort; America's Society Capital
- Location of Newport in Newport County, Rhode Island
- Coordinates: 41°29′30″N 71°18′43″W
- Country: United States
- State: Rhode Island
- County: Newport
- Incorporated (city): 1784
- Incorporated (town): 1639

Government
  - Mayor: Charlie Holder

Area
  - Total: 11.37 sq mi (29.46 km^{2})
  - Land: 7.66 sq mi (19.83 km^{2})
  - Water: 3.72 sq mi (9.63 km^{2})
- Elevation: 26 ft (7.9 m)

Population (2020)
  - Total: 25,163
  - Density: 3,286.8/sq mi (1,269.03/km^{2})
- Time zone: UTC−5 (EST)
  - Summer (DST): UTC−4 (EDT)
- ZIP Codes: 02840–02841
- Area code: 401
- FIPS code: 44-49960
- Website: www.cityofnewport.com

Newport is a seaside city on Aquidneck Island in Rhode Island, United States. It is located in Narragansett Bay, approximately 33 miles (53 km) southeast of Providence, 20 miles (32 km) south of Fall River, Massachusetts, 74 miles (119 km) south of Boston, and 180 miles (290 km) northeast of New York City. It is known as a New England summer resort and is famous for its historic mansions and its rich sailing history. As of the 2020 census, Newport had a population of 25,163.

Newport hosted the first U.S. Open tournaments in both tennis and golf, as well as every challenge for the America's Cup between 1930 and 1983. It is also the home of Salve Regina University and Naval Station Newport, which houses the United States Naval War College, the Naval Undersea Warfare Center, and an important Navy training center. It was a major 18th-century port city and has many buildings from the colonial era.

Newport is the county seat of Newport County, which has no governmental functions other than court administrative and sheriff corrections boundaries. It was the location of "Summer White Houses" of presidents Dwight D. Eisenhower and John F. Kennedy.

== History ==
=== Colonial period ===
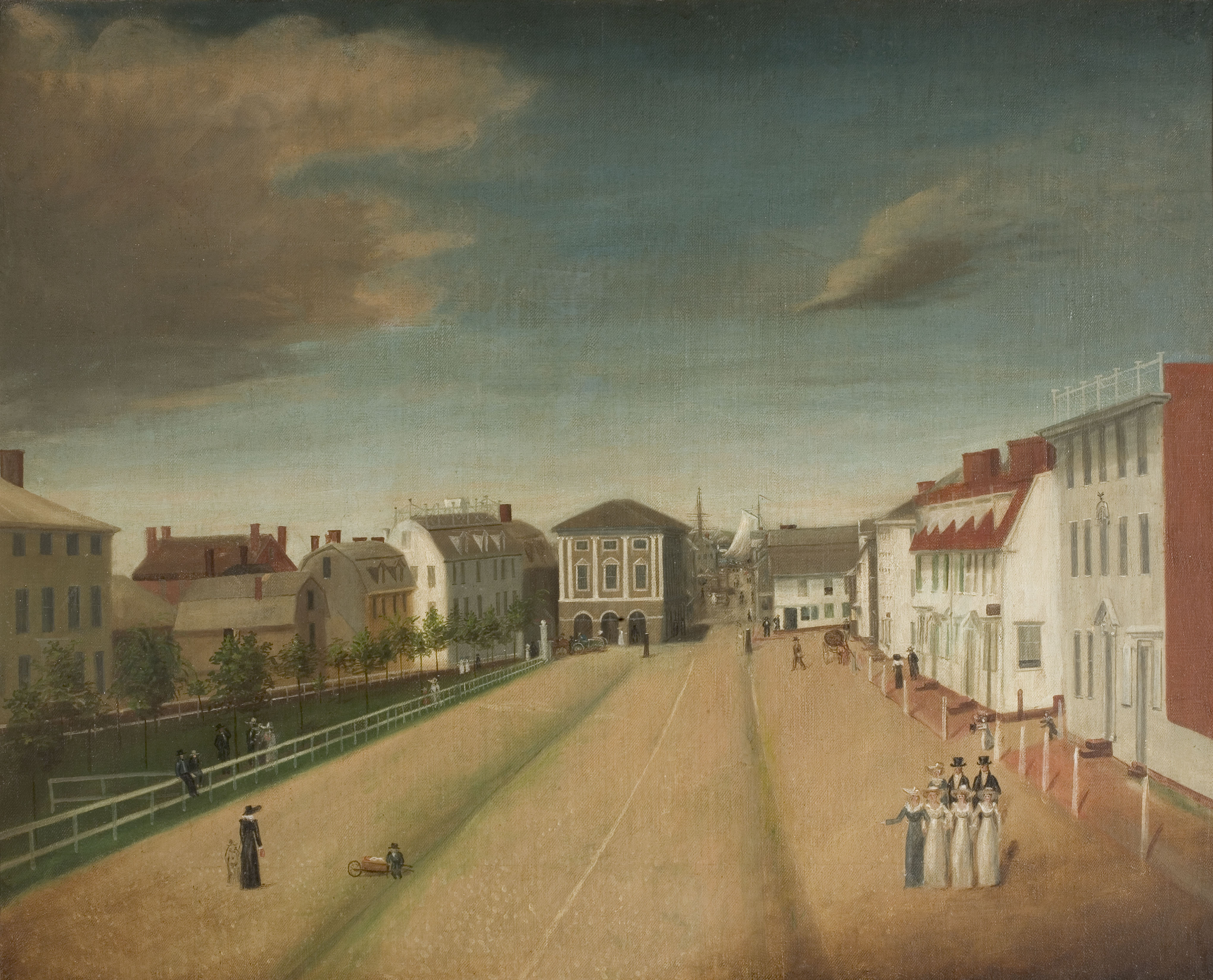
An 1818 painting of Newport reportedly painted by a Hessian artist

Newport was founded in 1639 on Rhode Island, which is now called Aquidneck Island. Its eight founders and first officers were Nicholas Easton, William Coddington, John Clarke, John Coggeshall, William Brenton, Jeremy Clark, Thomas Hazard, and Henry Bull. Many of these people were part of the settlement at Portsmouth, along with Anne Hutchinson and her followers. They separated within a year of settling Portsmouth and began the settlement of Newport on the southern side of the island.

Newport grew to be the largest of the four original settlements that became the Colony of Rhode Island and Providence Plantations, including Providence Plantations and Shawomett. Many of the first colonists in Newport became Baptists, and the second Baptist congregation in Rhode Island was formed in 1640 under the leadership of John Clarke.

In 1658, a group of Jews was welcomed to settle in Newport, fleeing the Inquisition in Spain and Portugal. They were not allowed to settle elsewhere. This group eventually came to be known as Congregation Jeshuat Israel, and is the second-oldest Jewish congregation in the United States. They meet in Touro Synagogue, the oldest synagogue in America.

The Colony of Rhode Island and Providence Plantations received its royal charter in 1663. Benedict Arnold was elected as the first governor. The Old Colony House at the head of Washington Square in Newport served as the seat of Rhode Island's government from 1741 until the current Rhode Island State House was completed in Providence in 1904. At that time, Providence became the state's sole capital city.

Newport was the most important port in colonial Rhode Island, and a public school was established in 1640. The commercial activity that raised Newport to its fame as a rich port began with the immigration of a second wave of Portuguese Jews, who settled there around the middle of the 18th century. The new settlers had been practicing Judaism secretly for 300 years in Portugal, and they were attracted to Rhode Island because of its freedom of worship. They brought with them commercial experience, connections, capital, and a spirit of enterprise.

Most prominent among them was Jacob Rodrigues Rivera, who arrived in 1745 (died 1789). Rivera introduced the manufacture of sperm oil, derived from sperm whales. This became one of Newport's leading industries and made the town a wealthy, prominent whaling community. Newport developed 17 manufacturers of oil and candles, and enjoyed a practical monopoly of this trade until the American Revolution.

Aaron Lopez is also credited with making Newport an important center of trade. He encouraged 40 Portuguese Jewish families to settle there, and Newport had 150 vessels engaged in trade within 14 years. Lopez was involved in the slave trade, as were other shipping magnates, and the manufacture of spermaceti candles, ships, barrels, rum, chocolate, textiles, clothes, shoes, hats, and bottles. Lopez became the wealthiest man in Newport, but he was denied citizenship on religious grounds, even though British law protected the rights of Jews to become citizens in England.

Lopez appealed to the Rhode Island colonial legislature for redress and was refused with this ruling:

Inasmuch as the said Aaron Lopez hath declared himself by religion a Jew, this Assembly doth not admit himself nor any other of that religion to the full freedom of this Colony. So that the said Aaron Lopez nor any other of said religion is not liable to be chosen into any office in this colony nor allowed to give vote as a free man in choosing others.

Lopez persisted by applying for citizenship in Massachusetts Bay Colony, where it was granted.

From the mid-17th century, the religious tolerance in Newport attracted numbers of Quakers, known also as the Society of Friends. The Great Friends Meeting House in Newport (1699) is the oldest existing structure of worship in Rhode Island.

In 1727, James Franklin (brother of Benjamin Franklin) printed the Rhode-Island Almanack in Newport. In 1732, he published the first newspaper, the Rhode Island Gazette. In 1758, his son James founded the weekly newspaper Mercury. The famous 18th-century Goddard and Townsend furniture was also made in Newport.

Throughout the 18th-century, Newport suffered from an imbalance of trade with the largest colonial ports. As a result, Newport merchants were forced to develop alternatives to conventional exports. In the 1720s, Colonial leaders arrested many pirates, acting under pressure from the British government. Many were hanged in Newport and buried on Goat Island.

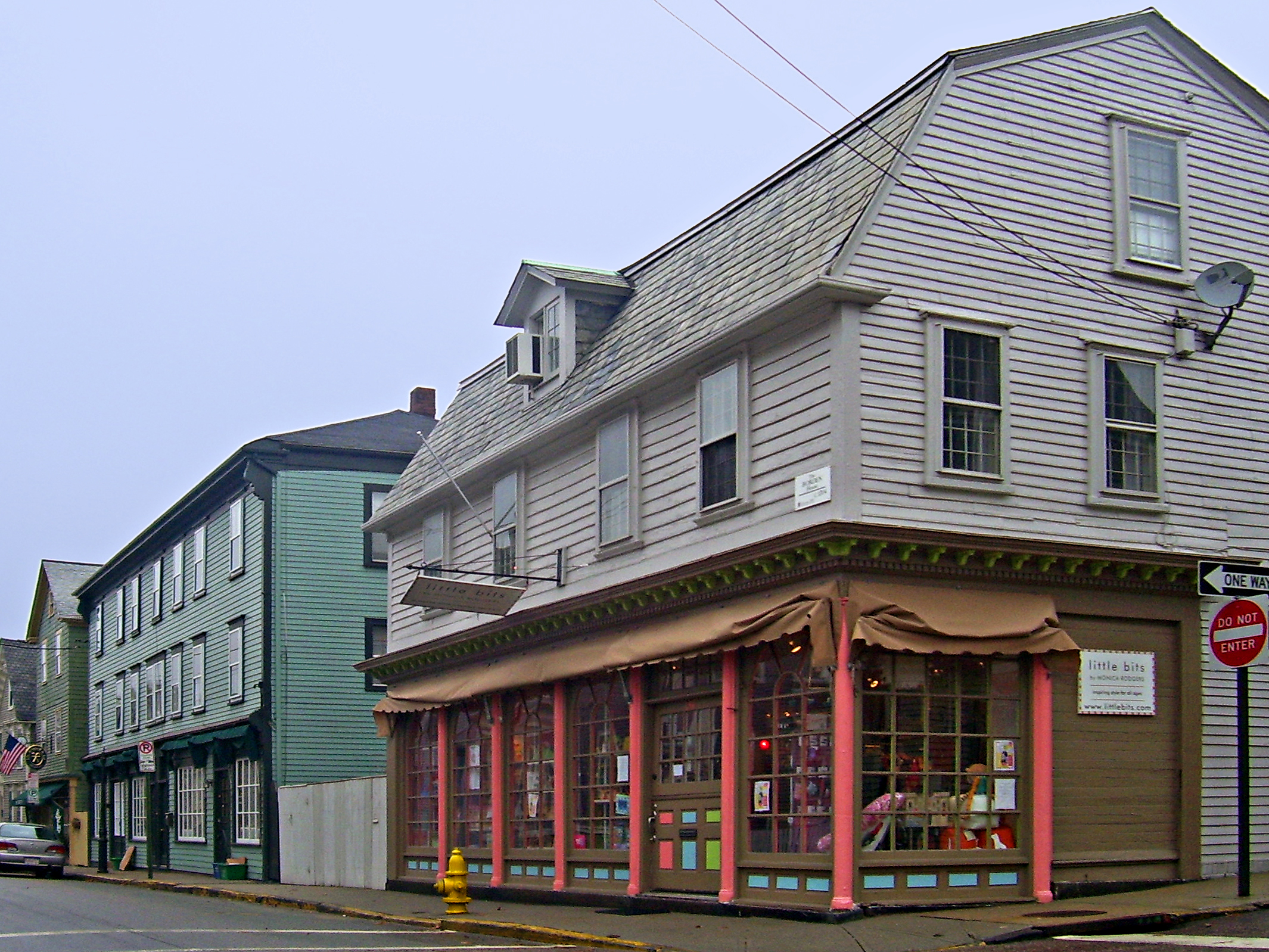
Colonial buildings in the Newport Historic District

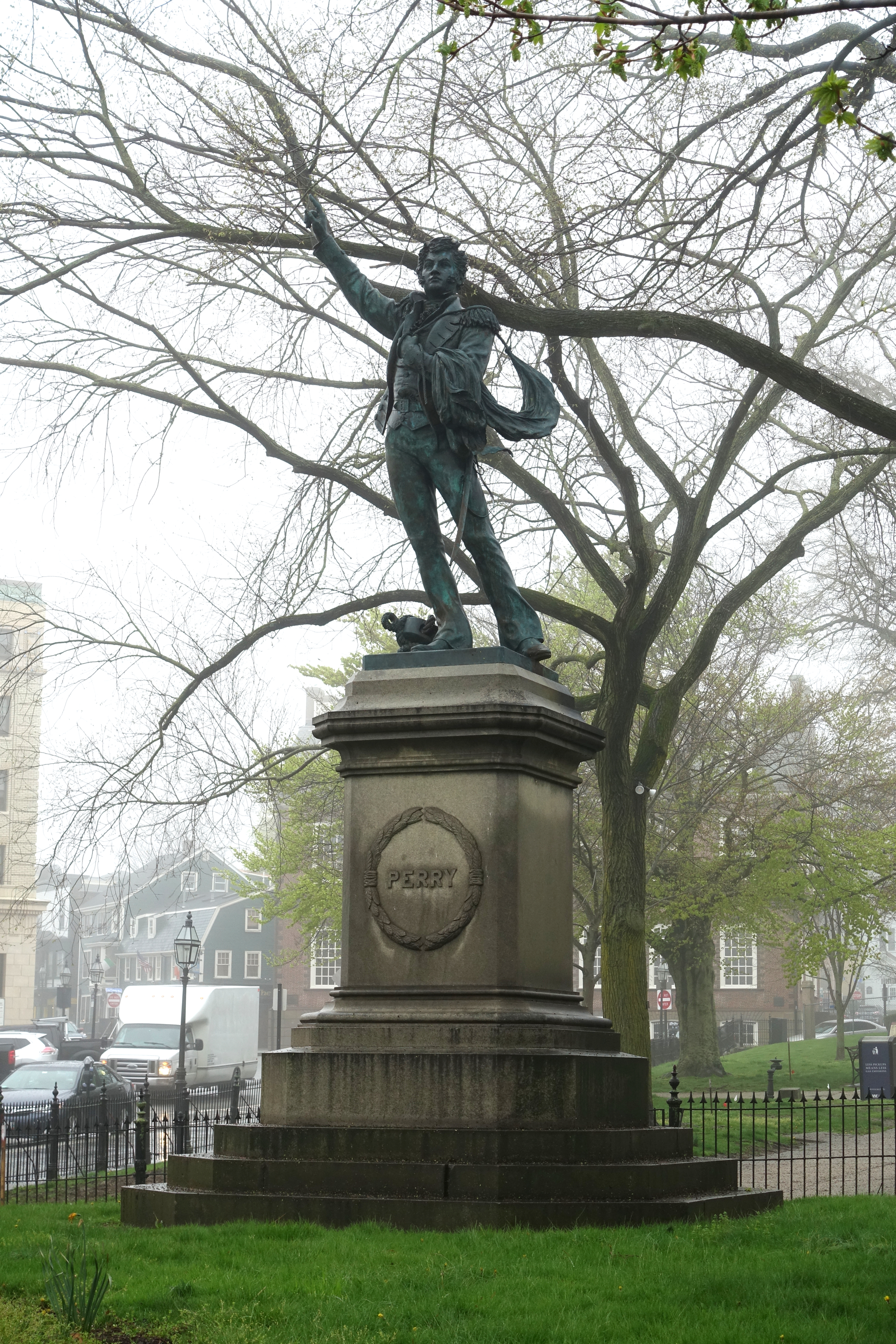
Oliver Perry Monument in Eisenhower Park

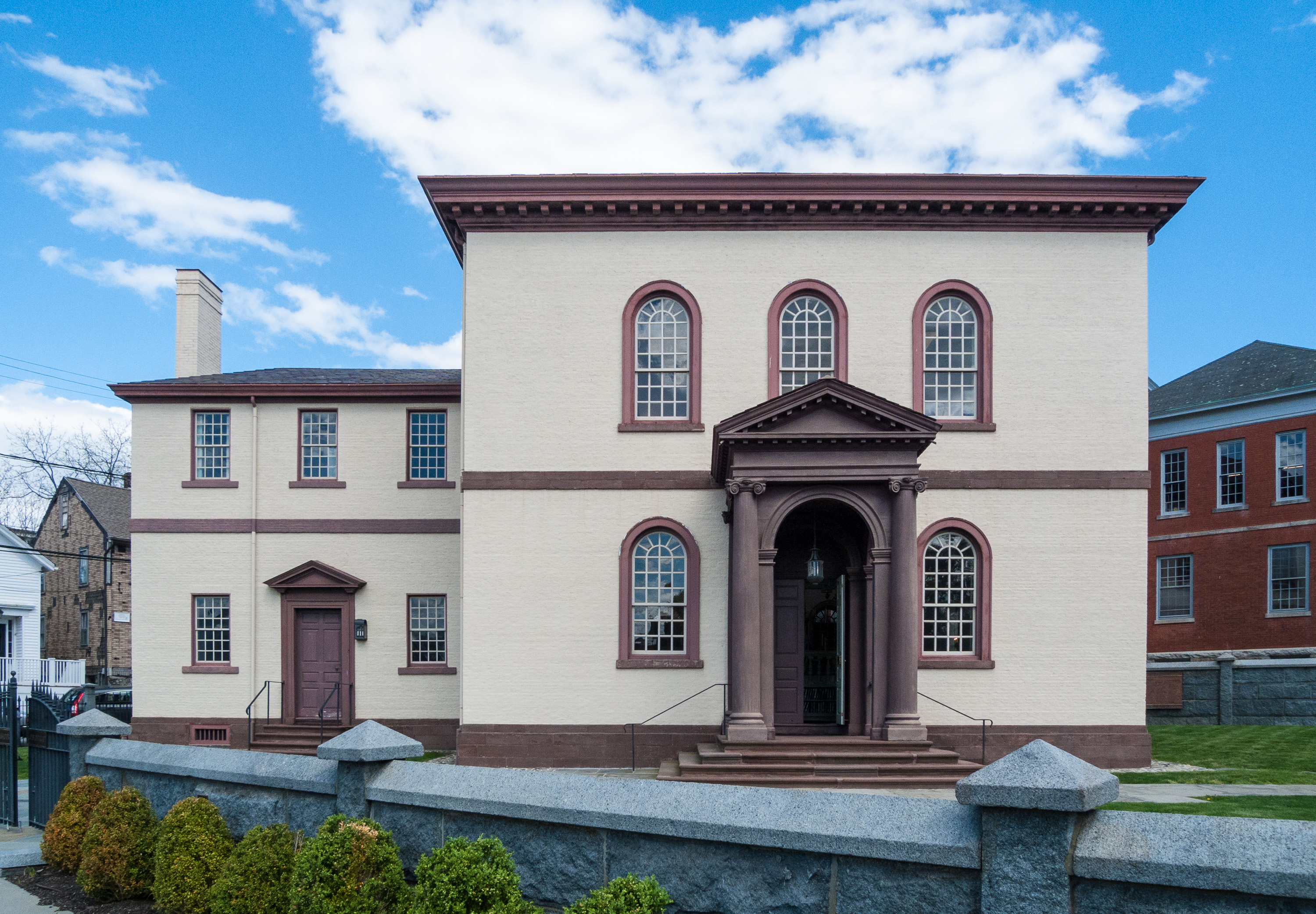
Touro Synagogue, the oldest existing synagogue in the United States

=== Slave trade ===
Newport was a major center of the slave trade in colonial and early America, active in the "triangle trade" in which slave-produced sugar and molasses from the Caribbean were carried to Rhode Island and distilled into rum that was then carried to West Africa and exchanged for captives. In 1764, Rhode Island had about 30 rum distilleries, 22 in Newport alone.

Slaves were trafficked illegally into Rhode Island, breaking a 1787 law prohibiting residents of the state from trading in slaves. Slave traders were also breaking federal statutes of 1794 and 1800 barring Americans from carrying slaves to ports outside the United States, as well as the 1807 Congressional act abolishing the transatlantic slave trade.

A few Rhode Island families made substantial fortunes in the trade. William and Samuel Vernon were Newport merchants who later played an important role in financing the creation of the United States Navy; they sponsored 30 African slaving ventures. However, it was the DeWolfs of Bristol, Rhode Island, and most notably James De Wolf, who were the largest slave-trading family in America, mounting more than 80 transatlantic voyages, most of them illegal. The Rhode Island slave trade was broadly based. Seven hundred Rhode Islanders owned or captained slave ships, most of whom were substantial merchants, though many were ordinary shopkeepers and tradesmen who purchased shares in slaving voyages.

Newport was inhabited by a small group of abolitionists and free blacks. Reverend Samuel Hopkins, minister at Newport's First Congregational Church, has been called "America's first abolitionist". Among subscribers to Hopkins' writings were 17 free black citizens, most of whom lived in Newport. This community of freemen, including Newport Gardner, founded the Free African Union Society in 1780, the first African mutual aid society in America.

=== American Revolutionary era ===
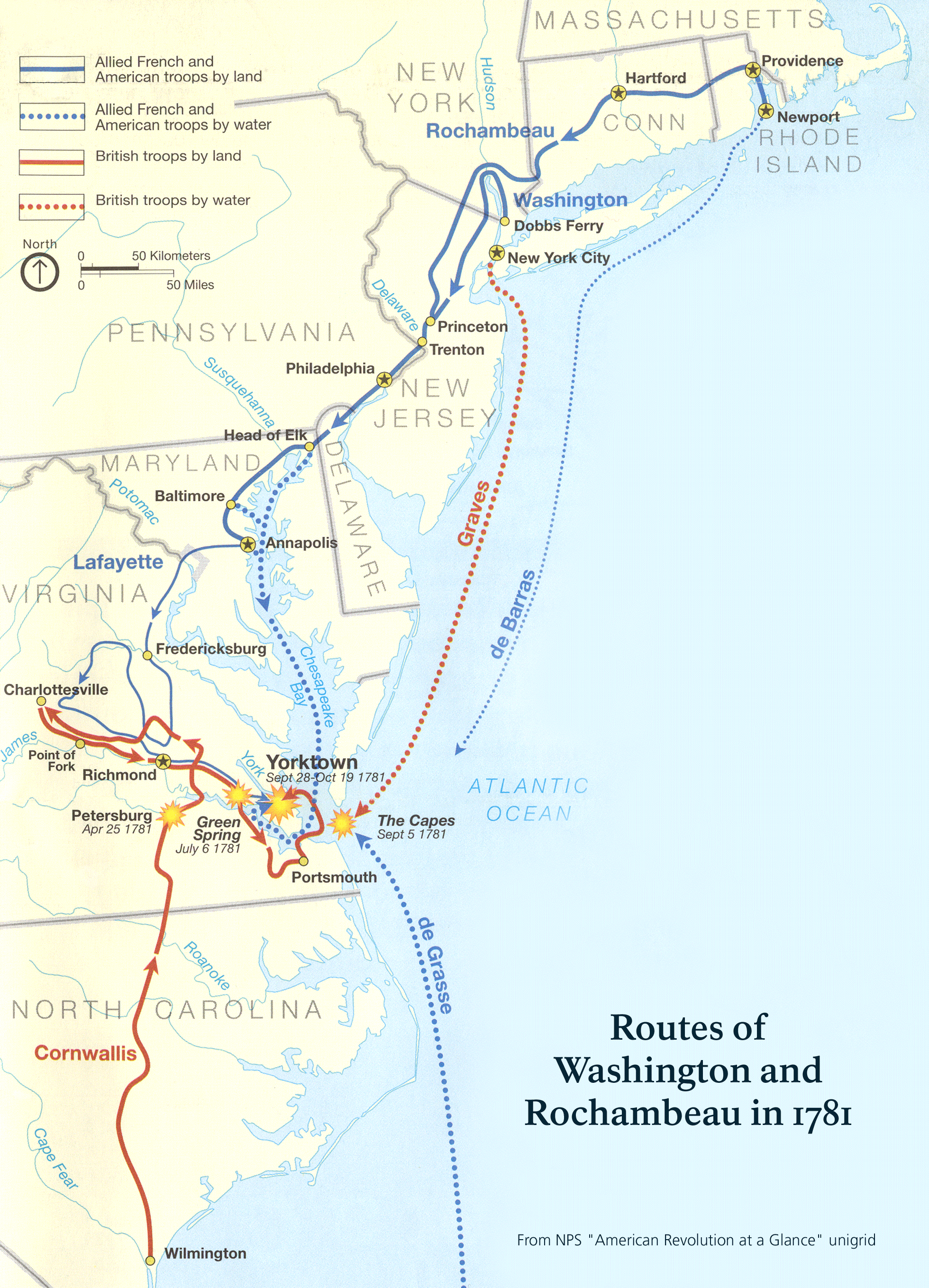
Map of the Washington–Rochambeau Revolutionary Route

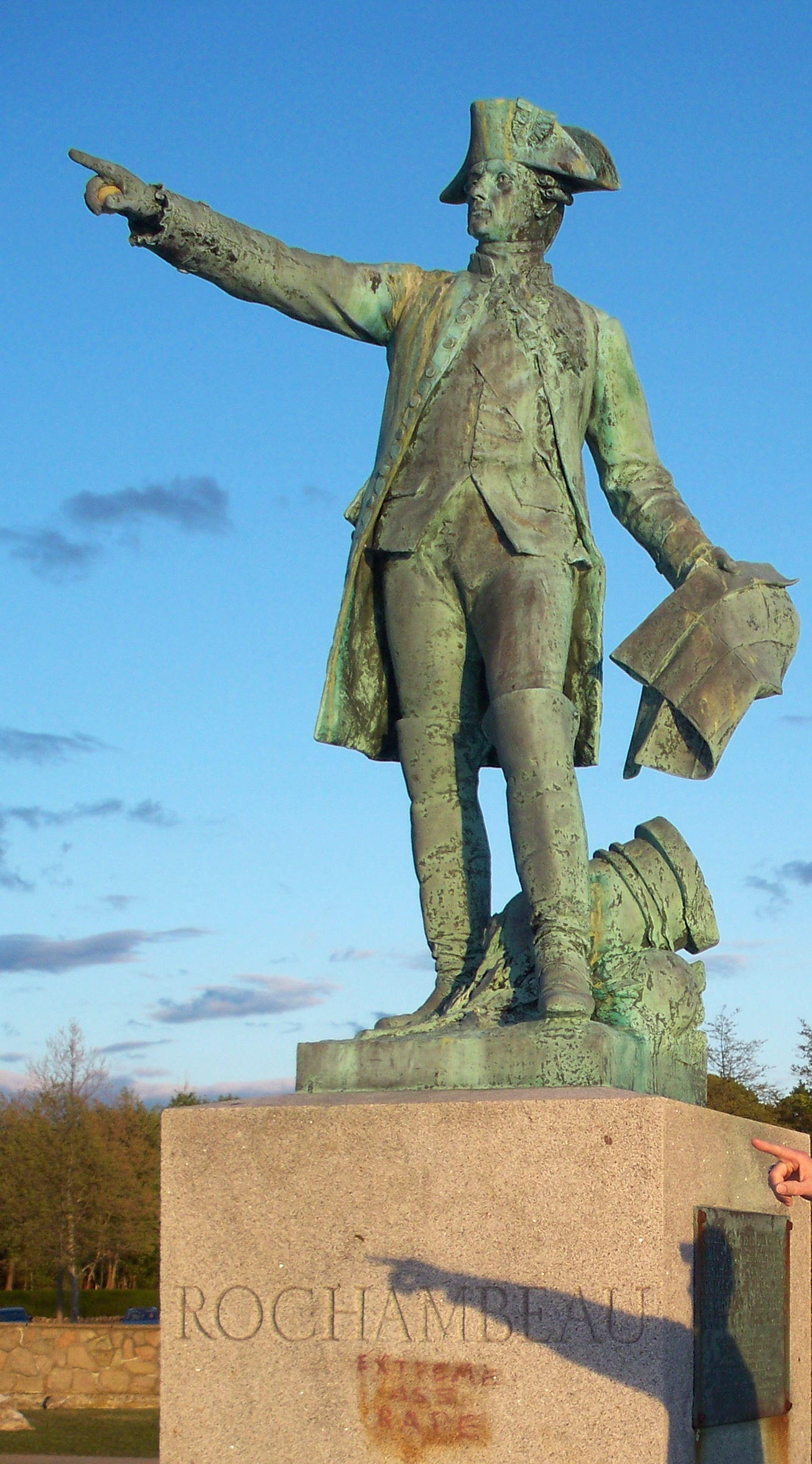
A statue of Comte de Rochambeau in Newport's King Park

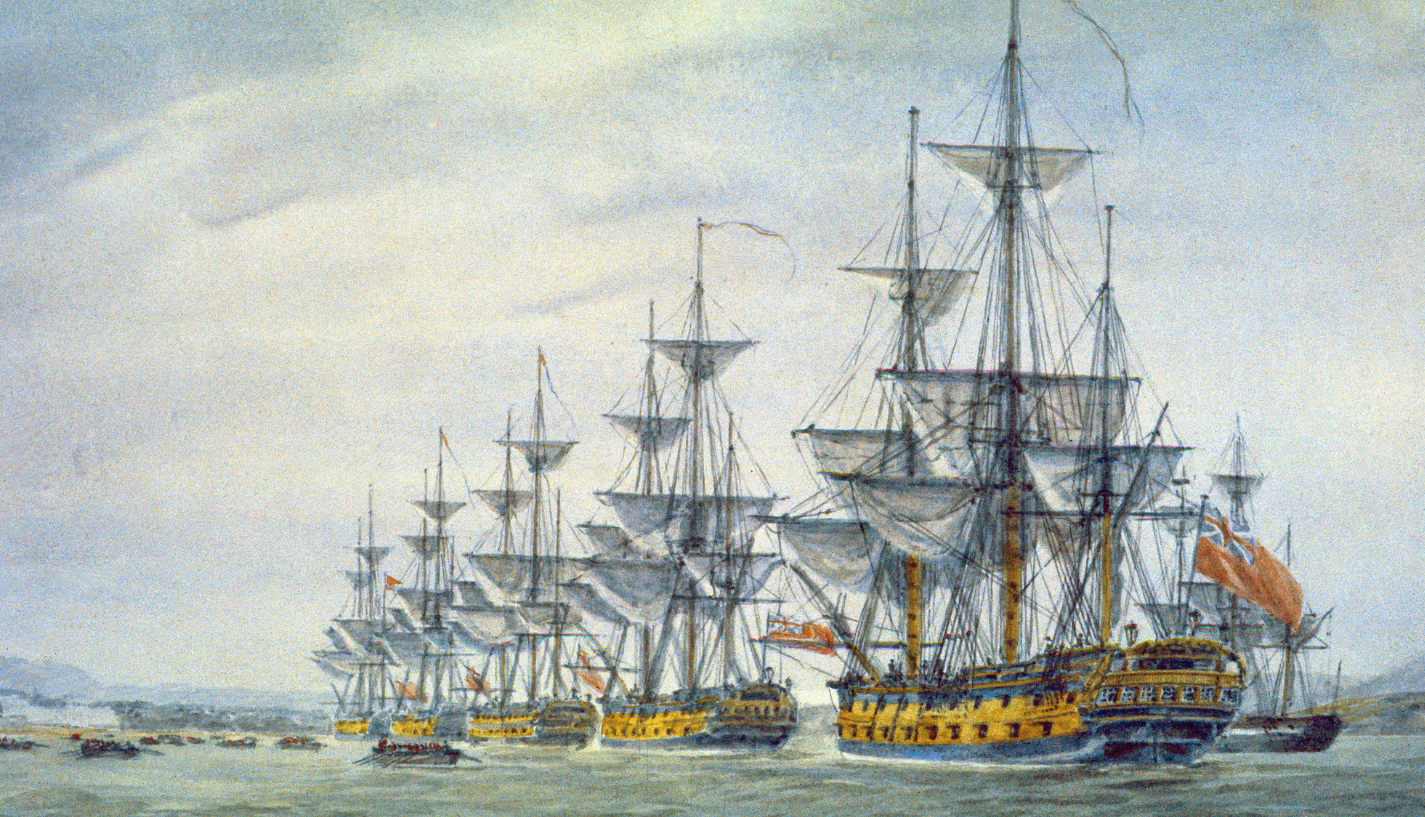
The British capture of Newport on December 8, 1776

Newport was the scene of much activity during the American Revolution. William Ellery was a Newport native and one of the signers of the Declaration of Independence.

In the winter of 1775, and 1776, the Rhode Island Legislature placed militia general William West in charge of rooting out loyalists in Newport, which resulted in several individuals being exiled to the northern part of the state, including Joseph Wanton and Thomas Vernon.

On December 8, 1776, the British occupied the city without opposition. Sir Peter Parker led 50-gun British ships, while Lieutenant-General Henry Clinton led 7,000 troops. According to Alfred Thayer Mahan, "The immediate effect was to close a haven of privateers, which flanked the route of all vessels bound from Europe to New York."

In the summer of 1778, the Americans began the campaign known as the Battle of Rhode Island. This was the first joint operation between the Americans and the French after the signing of the Treaty of Alliance. The Americans based in Tiverton planned a formal siege of the town, but the French refused to take part, instead preferring a frontal assault. This weakened the American position, and the British were able to expel the Americans from the island.

In 1779, the British abandoned the location. Rodney lamented, "The evacuating Rhode Island was the most fatal measure that could possibly have been adopted. It gave up the best and noblest harbor in America, capable of containing the whole Navy of Britain, and where they could in all seasons lie in perfect security; and from whence squadrons, in forty-eight hours, could blockade the three capital cities of America; namely, Boston, New York, and Philadelphia."

On July 10, 1780, a French expedition arrived in Narragansett Bay off Newport with an army of 450 officers and 5,300 men, sent by King Louis XVI and commanded by Jean-Baptiste Donatien de Vimeur, comte de Rochambeau. For the rest of the war, Newport served as the base of the French forces in the United States. In July 1781, Rochambeau was finally able to leave Newport for Providence to begin the decisive march to Yorktown, Virginia, along with General George Washington. The Rochambeau Monument in King Park on Wellington Avenue commemorates Rochambeau's contributions to the Revolutionary War and to Newport's history.

Newport's population fell from over 9,000 (according to the census of 1774) to fewer than 4,000 by the time that the war ended (1783). Over 200 abandoned buildings were torn down in the 1780s. The war destroyed Newport's economic wealth, because years of military occupation closed the city to any form of trade.

It was in Newport that the Rhode Island General Assembly voted to ratify the Constitution in 1790 and become the 13th state, acting under pressure from the merchant community of Providence. The city was the last residence of Commodore Oliver Hazard Perry and the birthplace of Commodore Matthew C. Perry and Unitarian William Ellery Channing.

=== Summer mansions ===
Beginning in the mid-nineteenth century, wealthy southern planters seeking to escape the heat began to build summer cottages on Bellevue Avenue, such as Kingscote (1839). Around the middle of the century, wealthy northerners, such as the Wetmore family, began construction on larger mansions, such as Chateau-sur-Mer (1852) nearby. Most of these early families made a substantial part of their fortunes in the Old China Trade.

By the turn of the 20th century, many of the nation's wealthiest families were summering in Newport, including the Vanderbilts, Astors, and the Widener family, who constructed the largest "cottages", such as The Breakers (1895) and Miramar (1915). They resided for a brief summer social season in grand mansions with elaborate receiving rooms, dining rooms, music rooms, and ballrooms—but with few bedrooms, since the guests were expected to have "cottages" of their own. Many of the homes were designed by New York architect Richard Morris Hunt, who kept a house in Newport himself.

The social scene at Newport is described in Edith Wharton's novel The Age of Innocence. Wharton's own Newport "cottage" was called Land's End. Today, many mansions continue in private use. Hammersmith Farm is the mansion where John F. Kennedy and Jackie Kennedy held their wedding reception; it was open to tourists as a "house museum", but has since been purchased and reconverted into a private residence. Many of the other mansions are open to tourists, and others were converted into academic buildings for Salve Regina College in the 1930s, when the owners could no longer afford their tax bills.

In the mid-19th century, a large number of Irish immigrants settled in Newport. The Fifth Ward of Newport in the southern part of the city became a staunch Irish neighborhood for many generations. To this day, St. Patrick's Day is an important day of pride and celebration in Newport, with a large parade down Thames Street.

The oldest Catholic parish in Rhode Island is St. Mary's, located on Spring Street, though the current building is not original.

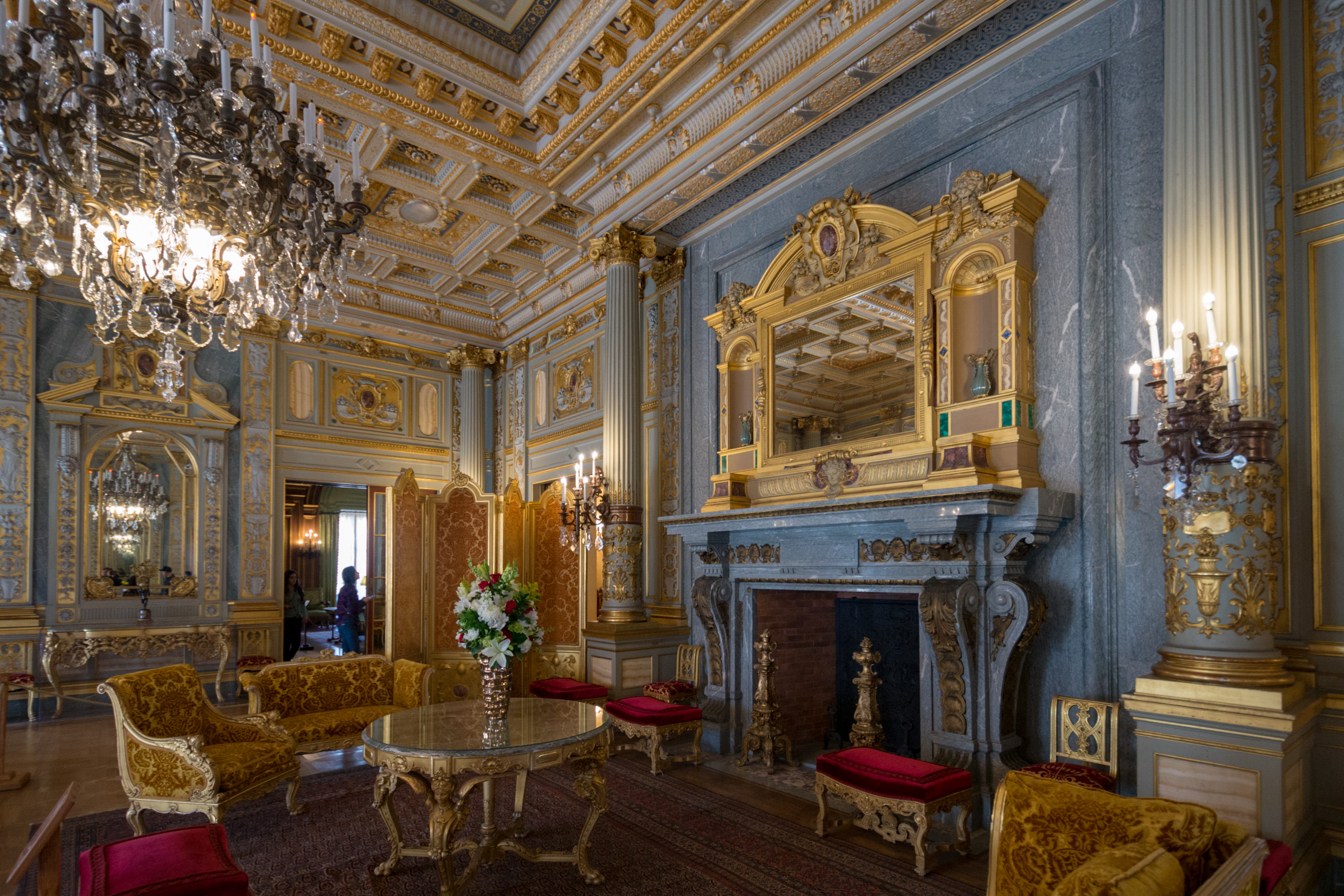
The Breakers (1895)

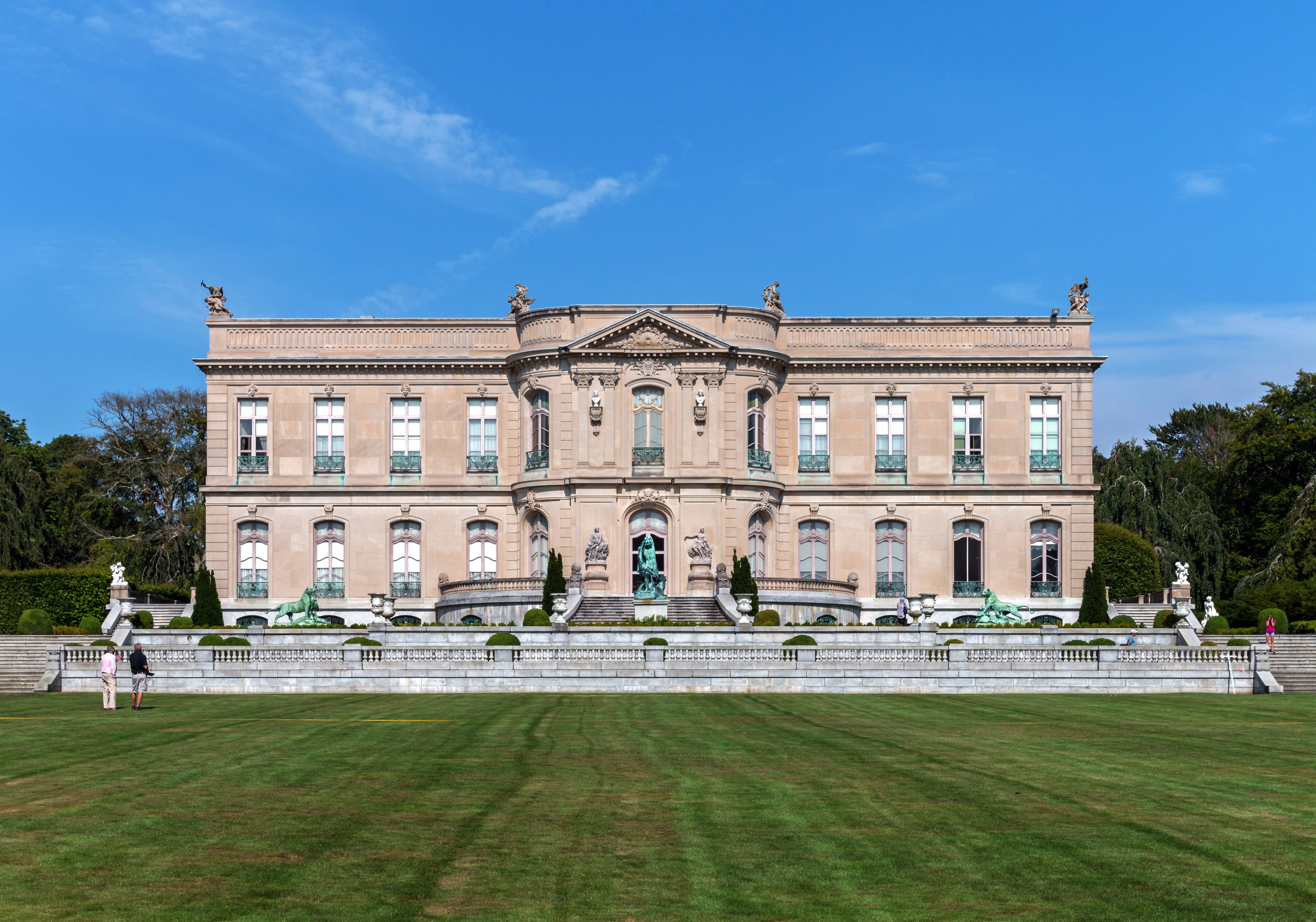
The Elms (1901)

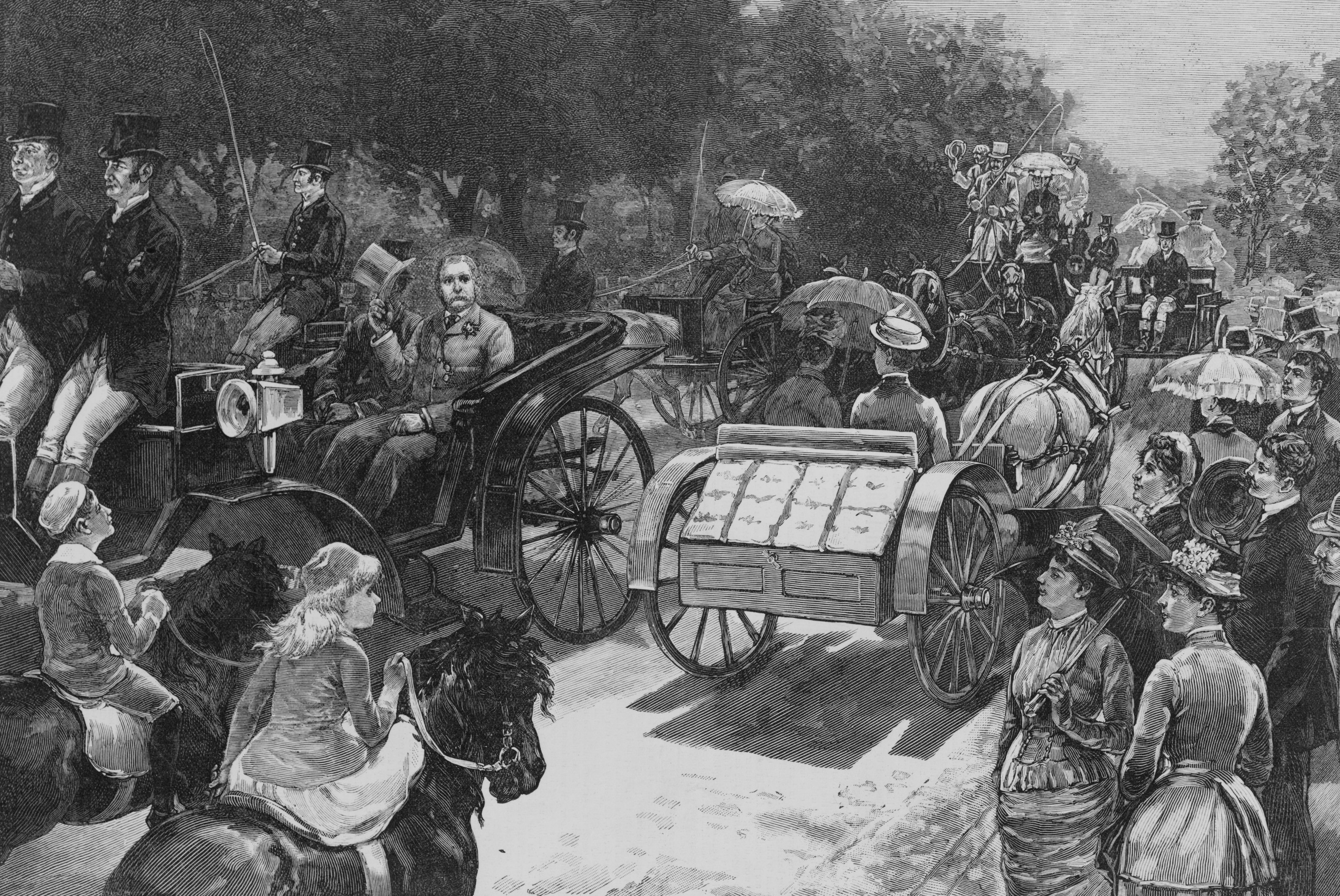
President Chester A. Arthur vacationed in Newport in 1884

=== 20th century and beyond ===
Rhode Island did not have a fixed capital during and after the colonial era, but rotated its legislative sessions among Providence, Newport, Bristol, East Greenwich, and South Kingstown. In 1854, the sessions were eliminated in cities other than Providence and Newport, and Newport was ultimately dropped in 1900 as a constitutional amendment that year restricted the meetings of the legislature to Providence.

=== The Kennedys and Newport ===
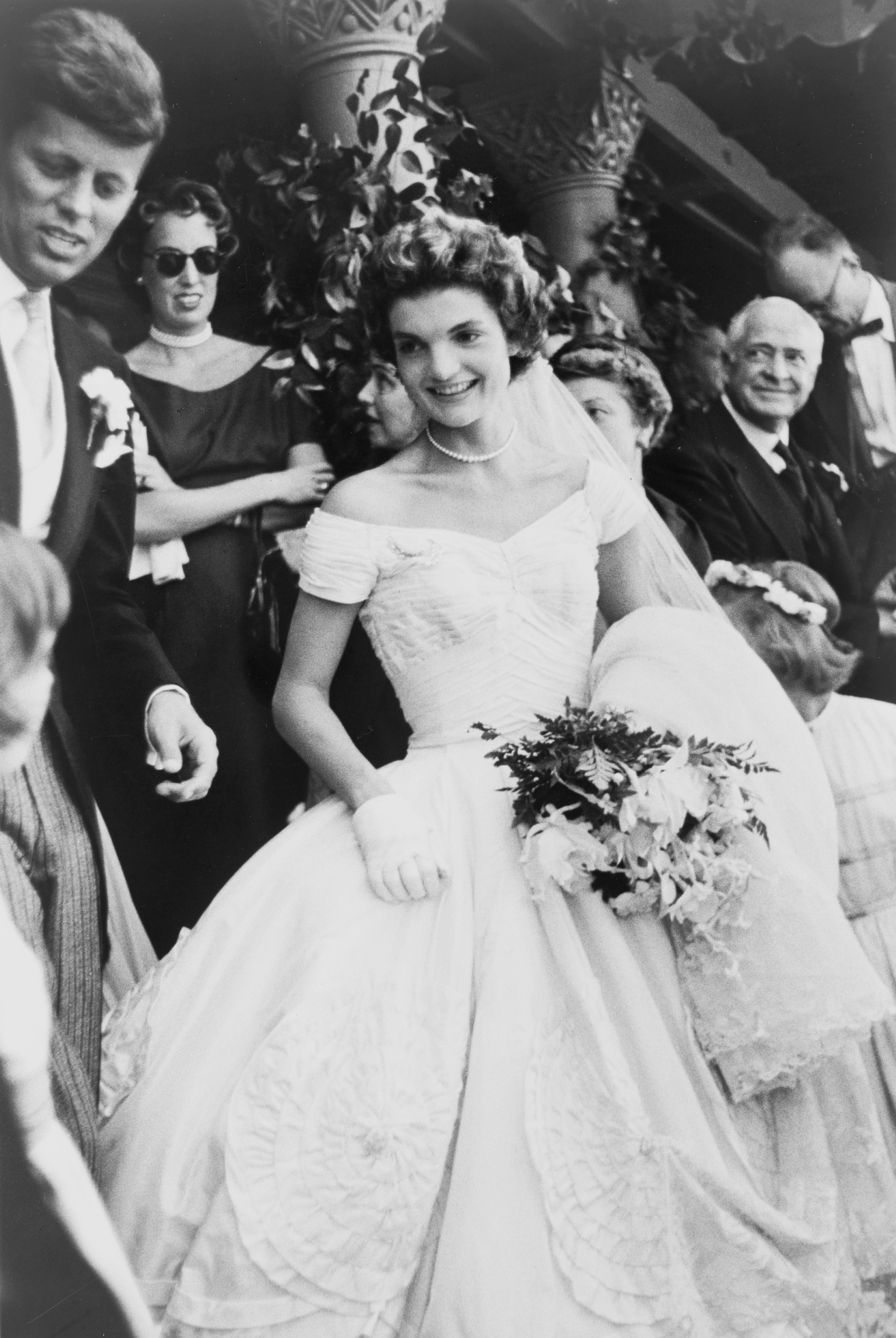
The Kennedys were married at St. Mary's Church

First Lady Jacqueline Kennedy Onassis had many ties to Newport. She spent her childhood summers at Newport's Hammersmith Farm. She and John Fitzgerald Kennedy attended nearby St. Mary's Church and were married there on September 12, 1953. The Kennedys sailed their yacht Honey Fitz in Narragansett Bay, golfed at Newport Country Club, dined at The White Horse Tavern, and attended social events at The Breakers.

Presidents Kennedy and Eisenhower both made Newport the sites of their "Summer White Houses" during their years in office. Eisenhower stayed at Quarters A at the Naval War College and at what became known as the Eisenhower House, while Kennedy used Hammersmith Farm.

=== U.S. Navy ===
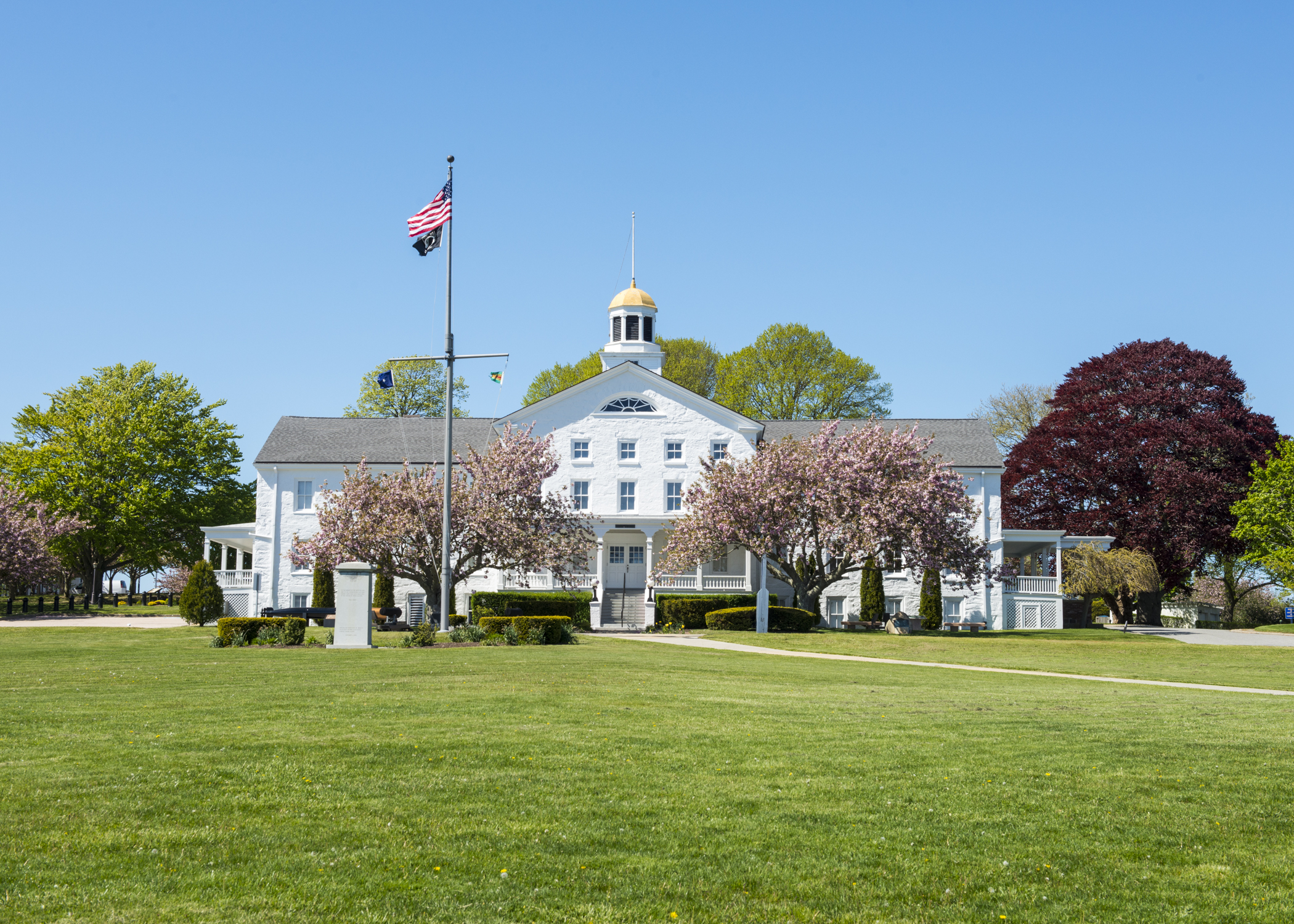
Founders Hall at the Naval War College

The city has long been entwined with the United States Navy. It held the campus of the U.S. Naval Academy during the American Civil War (1861–65) when the undergraduate officer training school was temporarily moved north from Annapolis, Maryland. From 1952 to 1973, it hosted the Cruiser-Destroyer Force of the U.S. Atlantic Fleet, and subsequently, it has hosted smaller numbers of warships from time to time. Today it hosts Naval Station Newport (NAVSTA Newport) and remains home to the U.S. Naval War College, the center for Surface Warfare Officer training, the Navy Supply Corps School and other schools, and the headquarters of the Naval Undersea Warfare Center. The decommissioned aircraft carrier USS Saratoga (CV-60) was moored in an inactive status at the docks previously used by the Cruiser-Destroyer Force until it was towed to Brownsville, Texas in August–September 2014 to be dismantled. The USS Forrestal (CV-59) shared the pier until June 2010.

The departure of the Cruiser-Destroyer fleet from Newport, and the closure of nearby Naval Air Station Quonset Point in 1973 were devastating to the local economy. The population of Newport decreased, businesses closed, and property values plummeted. However, in the late 1960s, the city began revitalizing the downtown area with the construction of America's Cup Avenue, malls of stores and condominiums, and upscale hotels. Construction was also completed on the Claiborne Pell Bridge. The Preservation Society of Newport County began opening Newport's historic mansions to the public, and the tourist industry has become Newport's primary commercial enterprise over the subsequent years.

== Geography and climate ==
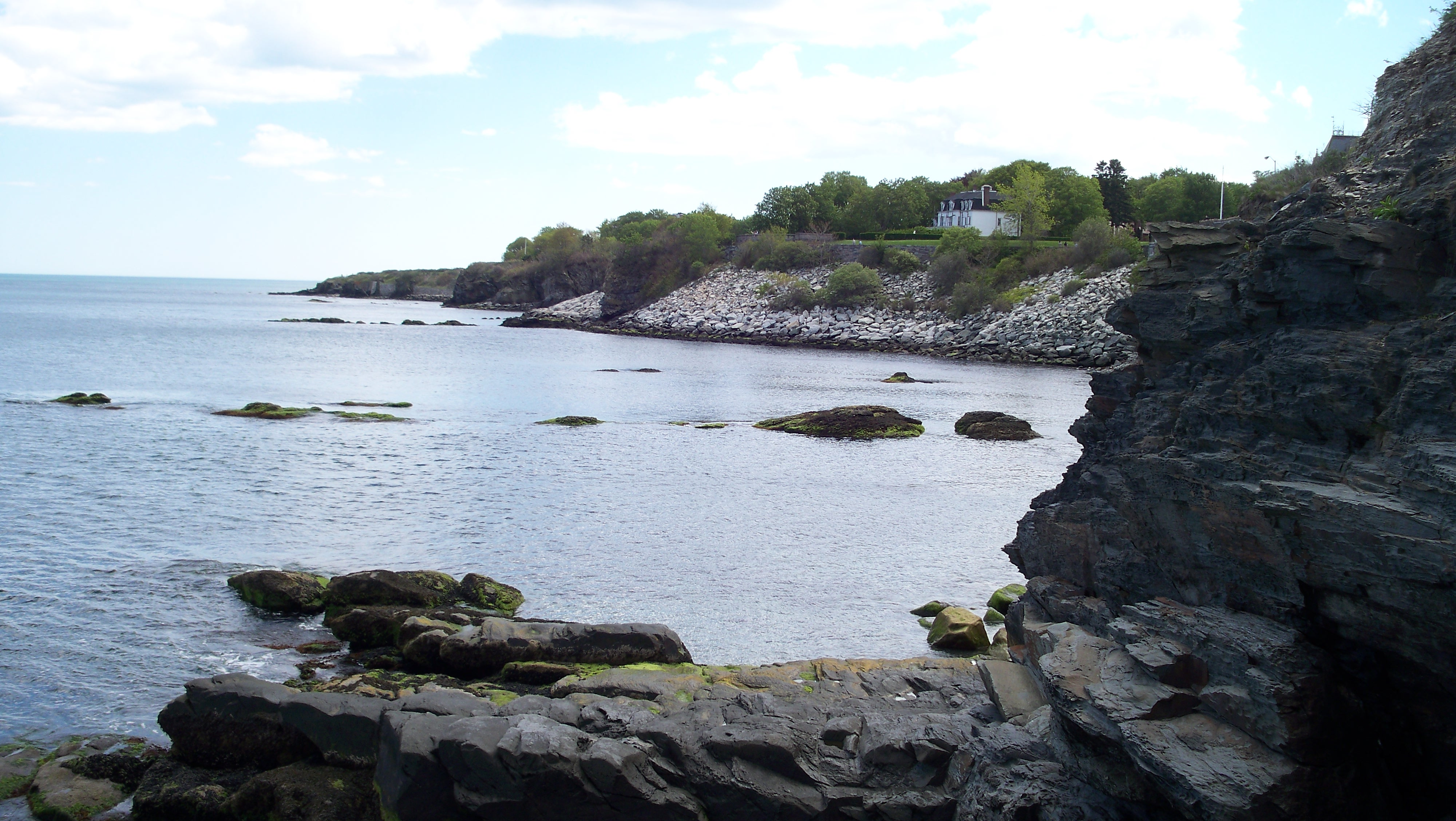
Shoreline of the Easton Bay looking south from the cliff side at east end of Narragansett Avenue

Newport is located on, and is the most populous municipality of, Aquidneck Island in Narragansett Bay. According to the United States Census Bureau, the city has a total area of 11.4 square miles (29.5 km^{2}), of which 7.7 square miles (19.9 km^{2}) is land and 3.7 square miles (9.6 km^{2}), or 32.64%, is water. The Newport Bridge, the longest suspension bridge in New England, connects Newport to neighboring Conanicut Island across the East Passage of the Narragansett.

Newport has a humid continental climate (Köppen Dfa/Dfb), bordering on a humid subtropical climate (Köppen Cfa) and oceanic climate (Köppen Cfb). Being surrounded by ocean water, Newport is often cooler in the summer than some coastal cities further north, such as Boston. According to the USDA, Newport is located in plant hardiness zone 7a.

Climate data for Newport, Rhode Island (Rose Island Light), 1991–2020 normals, extremes 1957–2003
Month	Jan	Feb	Mar	Apr	May	Jun	Jul	Aug	Sep	Oct	Nov	Dec	Year
Record high °F (°C)	65 (18)	65 (18)	74 (23)	86 (30)	89 (32)	93 (34)	96 (36)	98 (37)	93 (34)	81 (27)	73 (23)	69 (21)	98 (37)
Mean daily maximum °F (°C)	38.6 (3.7)	40.0 (4.4)	45.9 (7.7)	55.2 (12.9)	64.8 (18.2)	71.6 (22.0)	77.4 (25.2)	78.0 (25.6)	72.9 (22.7)	62.7 (17.1)	53.0 (11.7)	44.2 (6.8)	58.7 (14.8)
Daily mean °F (°C)	31.3 (−0.4)	32.6 (0.3)	38.8 (3.8)	47.5 (8.6)	56.7 (13.7)	64.7 (18.2)	70.8 (21.6)	71.1 (21.7)	66.1 (18.9)	55.9 (13.3)	46.2 (7.9)	37.7 (3.2)	51.6 (10.9)
Mean daily minimum °F (°C)	23.9 (−4.5)	25.1 (−3.8)	31.7 (−0.2)	39.7 (4.3)	48.6 (9.2)	57.7 (14.3)	64.3 (17.9)	64.1 (17.8)	59.2 (15.1)	49.1 (9.5)	39.5 (4.2)	31.3 (−0.4)	44.5 (6.9)
Record low °F (°C)	−9 (−23)	−3 (−19)	3 (−16)	10 (−12)	21 (−6)	37 (3)	41 (5)	41 (5)	35 (2)	26 (−3)	11 (−12)	−5 (−21)	−9 (−23)
Average precipitation inches (mm)	4.03 (102)	3.57 (91)	4.61 (117)	4.73 (120)	3.91 (99)	3.17 (81)	3.21 (82)	3.29 (84)	3.82 (97)	4.72 (120)	3.94 (100)	4.45 (113)	47.45 (1,205)
Average snowfall inches (cm)	5.5 (14)	9.1 (23)	4.8 (12)	1.3 (3.3)	0.0 (0.0)	0.0 (0.0)	0.0 (0.0)	0.0 (0.0)	0.0 (0.0)	0.0 (0.0)	0.1 (0.25)	5.2 (13)	26.0 (66)
Average precipitation days (≥ 0.01 in)	11.5	9.2	11.5	11.5	11.9	10.3	9.3	10.6	10.8	8.8	9.7	10.7	125.8
Average snowy days (≥ 0.1 in)	3.0	3.4	1.7	0.5	0.0	0.0	0.0	0.0	0.0	0.0	0.2	1.6	10.4
Source: NOAA

Climate data for Newport State Airport, Rhode Island (1991–2020 normals, extremes 1996–present)
Month	Jan	Feb	Mar	Apr	May	Jun	Jul	Aug	Sep	Oct	Nov	Dec	Year
Record high °F (°C)	67 (19)	69 (21)	74 (23)	88 (31)	91 (33)	93 (34)	98 (37)	93 (34)	91 (33)	84 (29)	75 (24)	70 (21)	98 (37)
Mean maximum °F (°C)	55.9 (13.3)	54.2 (12.3)	62.6 (17.0)	72.8 (22.7)	81.9 (27.7)	85.7 (29.8)	90.0 (32.2)	87.9 (31.1)	84.0 (28.9)	76.5 (24.7)	66.6 (19.2)	60.4 (15.8)	91.9 (33.3)
Mean daily maximum °F (°C)	38.1 (3.4)	39.7 (4.3)	45.7 (7.6)	55.5 (13.1)	65.0 (18.3)	73.9 (23.3)	79.6 (26.4)	78.8 (26.0)	72.3 (22.4)	62.3 (16.8)	52.5 (11.4)	43.8 (6.6)	58.9 (15.0)
Daily mean °F (°C)	31.1 (−0.5)	32.4 (0.2)	38.3 (3.5)	47.4 (8.6)	56.8 (13.8)	65.8 (18.8)	71.8 (22.1)	71.2 (21.8)	64.7 (18.2)	54.5 (12.5)	45.2 (7.3)	36.8 (2.7)	51.3 (10.8)
Mean daily minimum °F (°C)	24.1 (−4.4)	25.1 (−3.8)	30.8 (−0.7)	39.3 (4.1)	48.5 (9.2)	57.8 (14.3)	64.1 (17.8)	63.6 (17.6)	57.1 (13.9)	46.8 (8.2)	37.9 (3.3)	29.9 (−1.2)	43.8 (6.6)
Mean minimum °F (°C)	5.7 (−14.6)	9.7 (−12.4)	16.2 (−8.8)	28.6 (−1.9)	38.2 (3.4)	47.4 (8.6)	56.5 (13.6)	53.9 (12.2)	45.2 (7.3)	34.1 (1.2)	24.1 (−4.4)	15.9 (−8.9)	3.7 (−15.7)
Record low °F (°C)	−6 (−21)	−8 (−22)	3 (−16)	22 (−6)	32 (0)	42 (6)	50 (10)	49 (9)	39 (4)	28 (−2)	15 (−9)	5 (−15)	−8 (−22)
Average precipitation inches (mm)	3.21 (82)	2.81 (71)	4.57 (116)	3.81 (97)	3.03 (77)	3.41 (87)	2.93 (74)	3.41 (87)	3.44 (87)	4.06 (103)	3.76 (96)	3.74 (95)	42.18 (1,072)
Average precipitation days (≥ 0.01 in)	10.0	9.2	10.2	11.3	12.6	11.8	10.3	10.1	10.2	11.7	9.3	11.1	127.8
Source: NOAA

== Demographics ==
Historical population
Year	Pop.	±%
1708	2,203	—
1730	4,640	+110.6%
1748	6,508	+40.3%
1755	6,753	+3.8%
1774	9,209	+36.4%
1782	5,530	−40.0%
1790	6,716	+21.4%
1800	6,739	+0.3%
1810	7,907	+17.3%
1820	7,319	−7.4%
1830	8,010	+9.4%
1840	8,333	+4.0%
1850	9,563	+14.8%
1860	10,508	+9.9%
1870	12,521	+19.2%
1880	15,693	+25.3%
1890	19,457	+24.0%
1900	22,441	+15.3%
1910	27,149	+21.0%
1920	30,255	+11.4%
1930	27,612	−8.7%
1940	30,532	+10.6%
1950	37,564	+23.0%
1960	47,049	+25.3%
1970	34,562	−26.5%
1980	29,259	−15.3%
1990	28,227	−3.5%
2000	26,475	−6.2%
2010	24,672	−6.8%
2020	25,163	+2.0%
Source: U.S. Decennial Census; 2019 estimate 1708–1782

=== 2020 census ===
As of the 2020 census, Newport had a population of 25,163, 10,898 households, and 4,982 families. The population density was 3,286.7 per square mile (1,269.0/km^{2}). There were 13,466 housing units at an average density of 1,758.9 per square mile (679.1/km^{2}).

99.7% of residents lived in urban areas, while 0.3% lived in rural areas.

There were 10,898 households in Newport, of which 18.9% had children under the age of 18 living in them. Of all households, 31.0% were married-couple households, 24.8% were households with a male householder and no spouse or partner present, and 37.1% were households with a female householder and no spouse or partner present. About 41.8% of all households were made up of individuals and 16.0% had someone living alone who was 65 years of age or older. The average household size was 2.1 and the average family size was 2.8.

There were 13,466 housing units, of which 19.1% were vacant. The homeowner vacancy rate was 1.6% and the rental vacancy rate was 6.6%.

Racial composition as of the 2020 census
Race	Number	Percent
White	19,102	75.9%
Black or African American	1,492	5.9%
American Indian and Alaska Native	217	0.9%
Asian	444	1.8%
Native Hawaiian and Other Pacific Islander	16	0.1%
Some other race	1,530	6.1%
Two or more races	2,362	9.4%
Hispanic or Latino (of any race)	2,975	11.8%

Of the population, 14.5% was under the age of 18, 15.5% from 18 to 24, 27.1% from 25 to 44, 23.5% from 45 to 64, and 19.3% who were 65 years of age or older. The median age was 37.9 years. For every 100 females, the population had 94.0 males, and for every 100 females ages 18 and older, there were 92.4 males.

The percent of those with a bachelor's degree or higher was estimated to be 41.0% of the population. The 2016–2020 5-year American Community Survey estimates show that the median household income was $68,201 (with a margin of error of +/- $4,880) and the median family income was $96,161 (+/- $10,800). Males had a median income of $40,018 (+/- $3,361) versus $29,535 (+/- $3,288) for females. The median income for those above 16 years old was $34,315 (+/- $2,816). Approximately, 12.4% of families and 14.4% of the population were below the poverty line, including 25.0% of those under the age of 18 and 7.7% of those ages 65 or over.

=== 2013 update ===
As of 2013, there were 24,027 people, 10,616 households, and 4,933 families residing in the city. The population density was 3,204.2 inhabitants per square mile (1,237.1/km^{2}). There were 13,069 housing units at an average density of 1,697.3 per square mile (655.3/km^{2}). The racial makeup of the city was 82.5% White, 6.9% African American, 0.8% Native American, 1.4% Asian, 0.1% Pacific Islander, 3.1% some other race, and 5.2% from two or more races. Hispanic or Latino of any race were 8.4% of the population (3.3% Puerto Rican, 1.2% Guatemalan, 1.1% Mexican).

There were 10,616 households, out of which: 21.2% had children under the age of 18 living with them, 30.9% were headed by married couples living together, 12.4% had a female householder with no husband present, and 53.5% were non-families. Of all households, 41.4% were made up of individuals, and 12.7% were someone living alone who was 65 years of age or older. The average household size was 2.05, and the average family size was 2.82.

The age distribution was 16.5% under the age of 18, 16.3% from 18 to 24, 28.1% from 25 to 44, 24.9% from 45 to 64, and 14.2% who were 65 years of age or older. The median age was 36.4 years. For every 100 females, there were 95.8 males. For every 100 females age 18 and over, there were 94.3 males.

For the period 2009–2011, the estimated median annual income for a household in the city was $59,388, and the median income for a family was $83,880. Male full-time workers had a median income of $52,221 versus $41,679 for females. The per capita income for the city was $35,644. About 10.7% of the population were below the poverty line.

== Culture ==
=== Colonial era architecture ===
The Newport Historic District — one of the city's three National Historic Landmark Districts — boasts one of the highest concentrations of colonial homes in the nation. Doris Duke, heir to the tobacco fortune of her father, James B. Duke, founded the Newport Restoration Foundation (NRF) in 1968, and for the next 25 years, until her death in 1993, saved much of Newport's colonial architectural heritage. Under Duke's leadership, the NRF restored more than 80 18th- and early 19th-century buildings in Newport and neighboring Middletown, Rhode Island, most of which are still owned by the Foundation.

The White Horse Tavern was built prior to 1673 and is one of the oldest taverns in the US. Newport is also home to the Touro Synagogue, one of the oldest Jewish houses of worship in the Western hemisphere. Newport also has the nation's oldest lending libraries, the Redwood Library and Athenaeum.

=== Gilded Age mansions ===
In addition to colonial architecture, the city is known for its many Gilded Age mansions — summer "cottages" built in varying styles copied from the royal palaces of Europe—mostly built between 1870 through 1915 by wealthy American families. Many of these mansions, including The Breakers (Vanderbilt family), Marble House (William Kissam Vanderbilt), Chateau-sur-Mer (William Shepard Wetmore), Rosecliff (Theresa Fair Oelrichs), and Rough Point (Doris Duke) are open to the public as museums.

=== Music ===
Newport Music Festivals

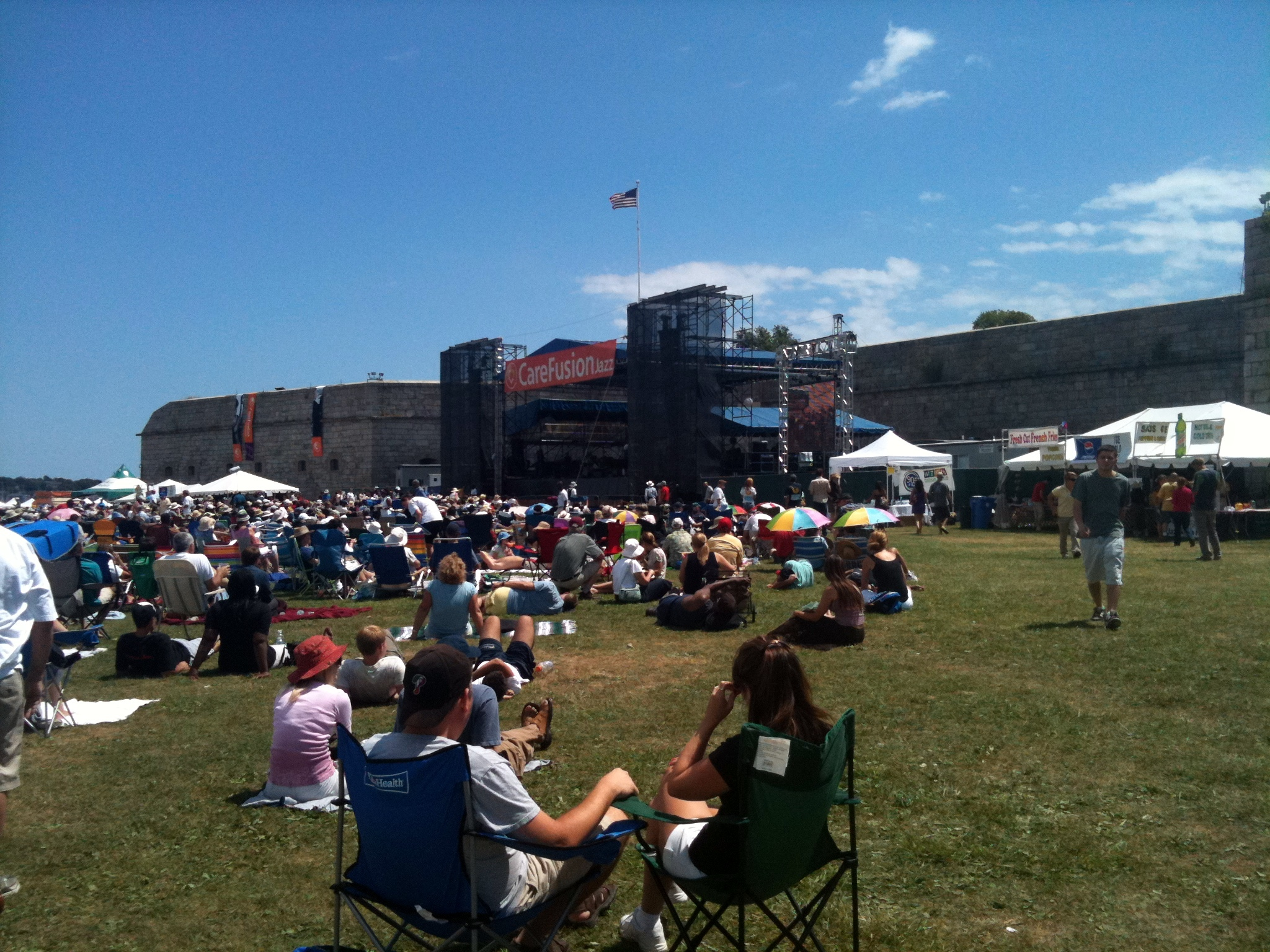
Jazz Festival

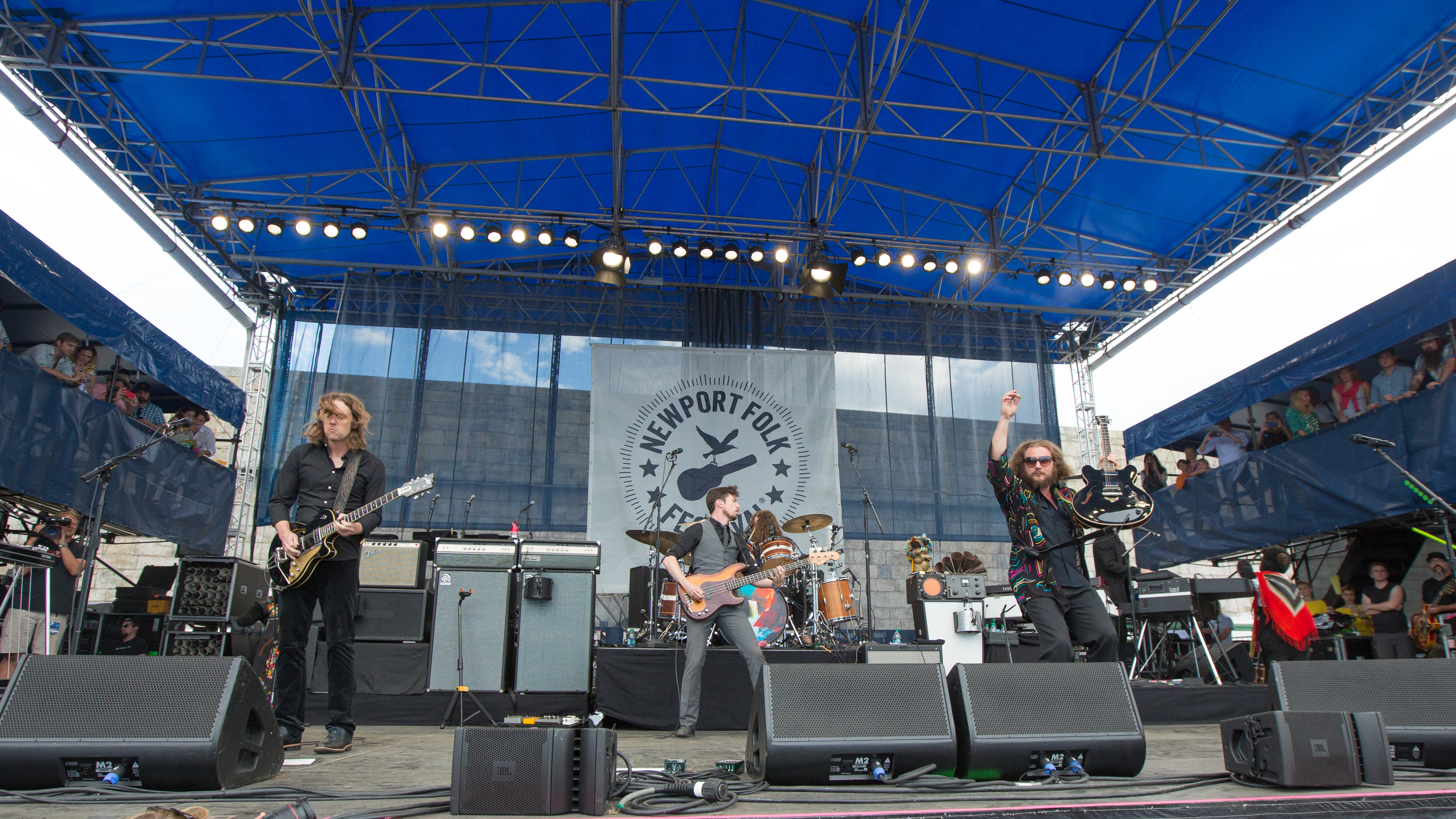
Folk Festival

Newport is the hometown of The Cowsills, a pop group formed by the members of the Cowsill family, which had success in the late 1960s. The alternative rock band Throwing Muses was founded in Newport in the 1980s by step-sisters Kristin Hersh and Tanya Donelly. Belly, an alternative band formed by Donnelly in the 1990s, was also based in Newport.

Fort Adams State Park hosts both the Newport Folk Festival and the Newport Jazz Festival. The Jazz Festival was established in 1954 by local socialite Elaine Lorillard and music promoter George Wein. It was held annually until 1971, and was re-established in Newport in 1981. In 1959, George Wein, folk singer Pete Seeger, and music manager Albert Grossman established the Newport Folk Festival as a counterpart to the Jazz Festival. It was held in Newport through 1969, returned to the city in 1985, and has been held annually at Fort Adams since. The Folk Festival was the venue for a controversial performance by singer-songwriter Bob Dylan in July 1965 that proved influential on the folk rock genre. Both festivals were held at other venues in Newport before moving to Fort Adams when they were revived in the 1980s.

=== Film ===
The Jane Pickens Theater, a single-screen arthouse movie theater, is located on Touro Street in downtown Newport. The theater was built as a church in 1834, and was converted into a movie theater in 1922. The theater was renamed after singer Jane Pickens in 1974. The Jane Pickens Theater became the only movie theater on Aquidneck Island after a multiplex theater in Middletown closed in January 2024.

Newport has been a filming location for several motion pictures, including High Society (1956), The Great Gatsby (1974), Mr. North (1988), Wind (1992), True Lies (1994), Amistad (1997), Me, Myself & Irene (2000), Dan in Real Life (2007), Moonrise Kingdom (2012), Irrational Man (2015) and Hocus Pocus 2 (2022).

=== Aquarium ===
The Hamilton Family Aquarium, operated by the non-profit Save the Bay, opened at the Gateway Center on America's Cup Avenue in March 2024. Save the Bay had previously operated an aquarium at Easton's Beach until October 2023.

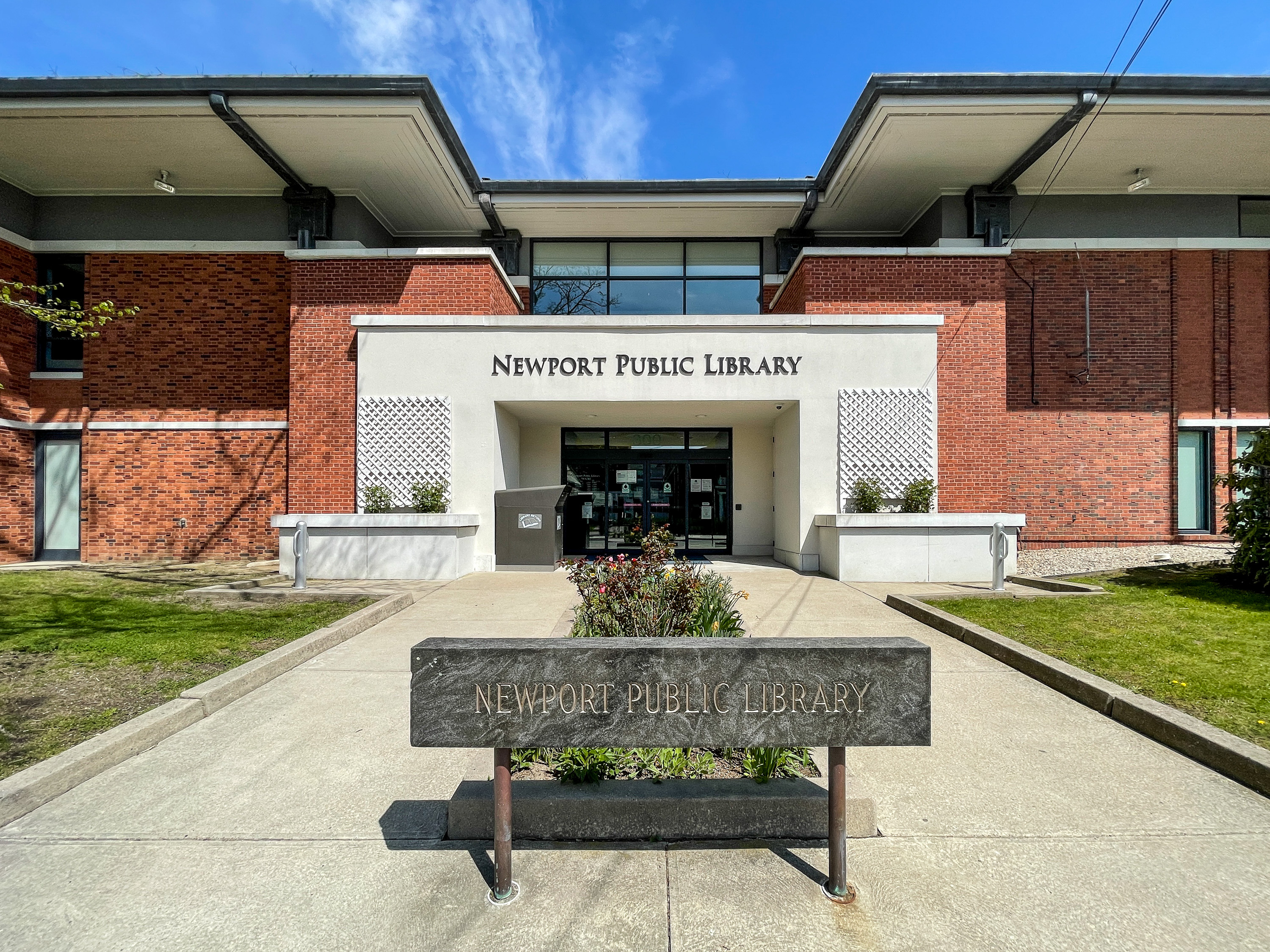
Newport Public Library

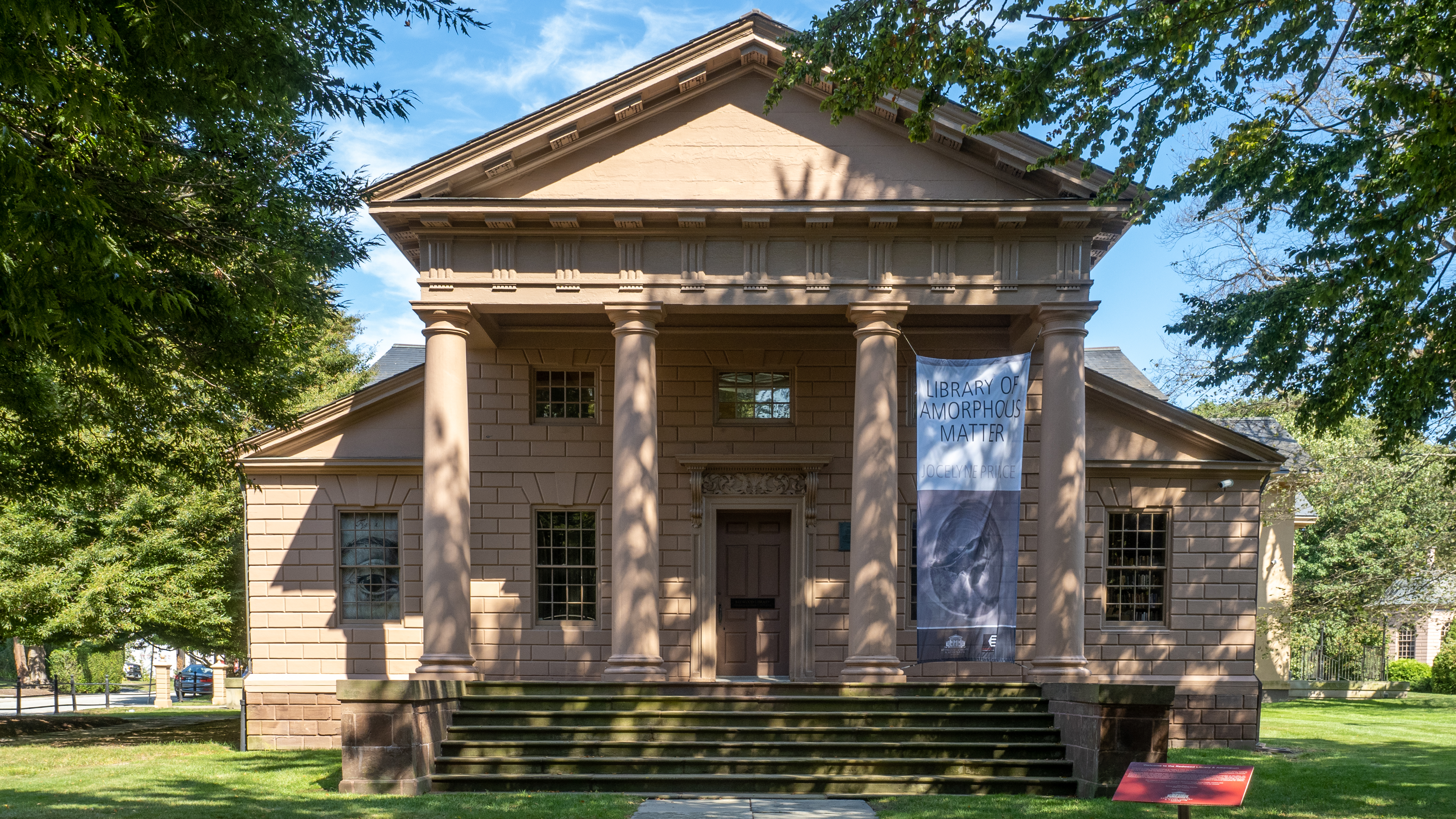
Redwood Library and Athenaeum

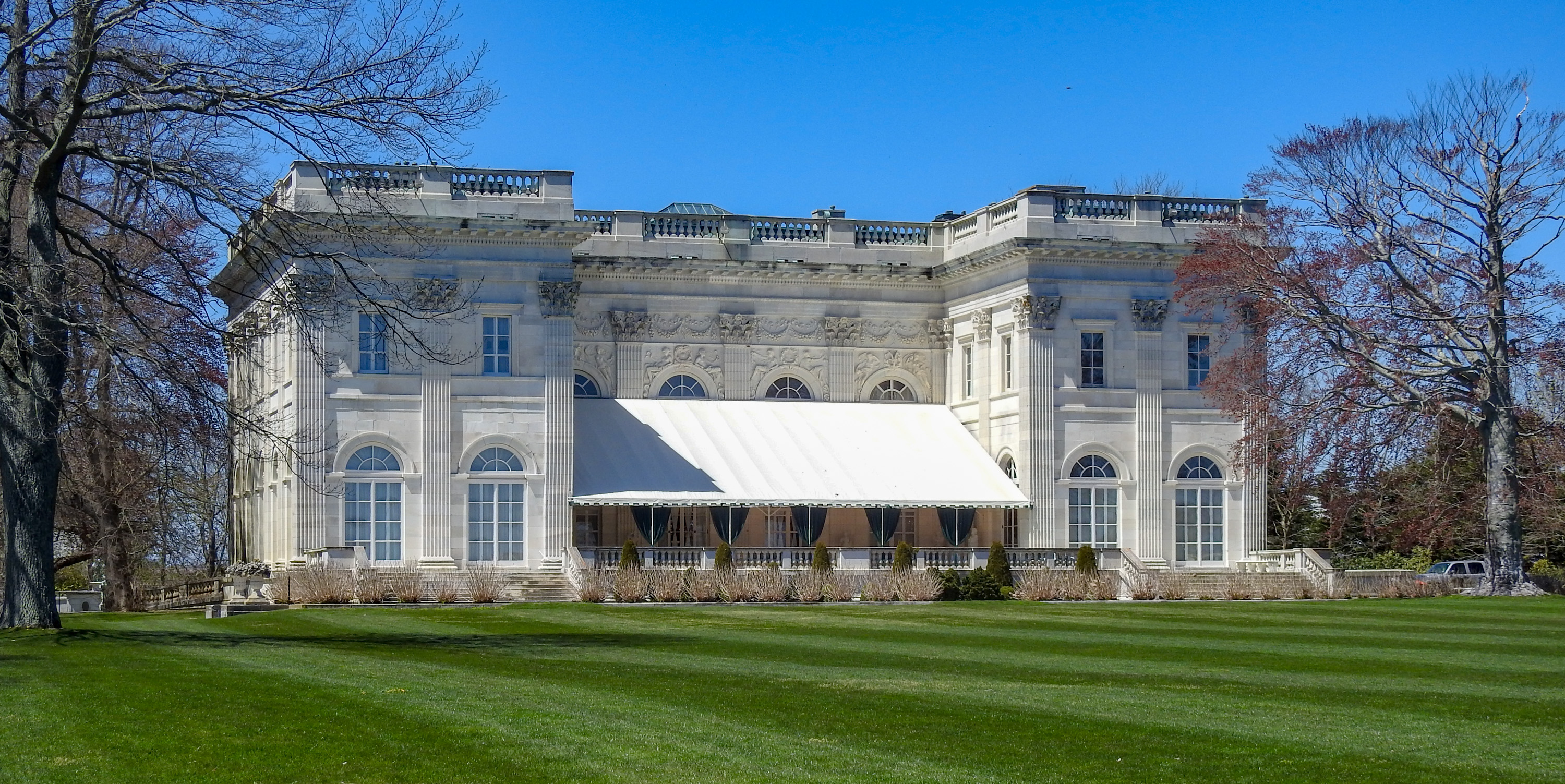
Marble House, owned and operated by the Preservation Society

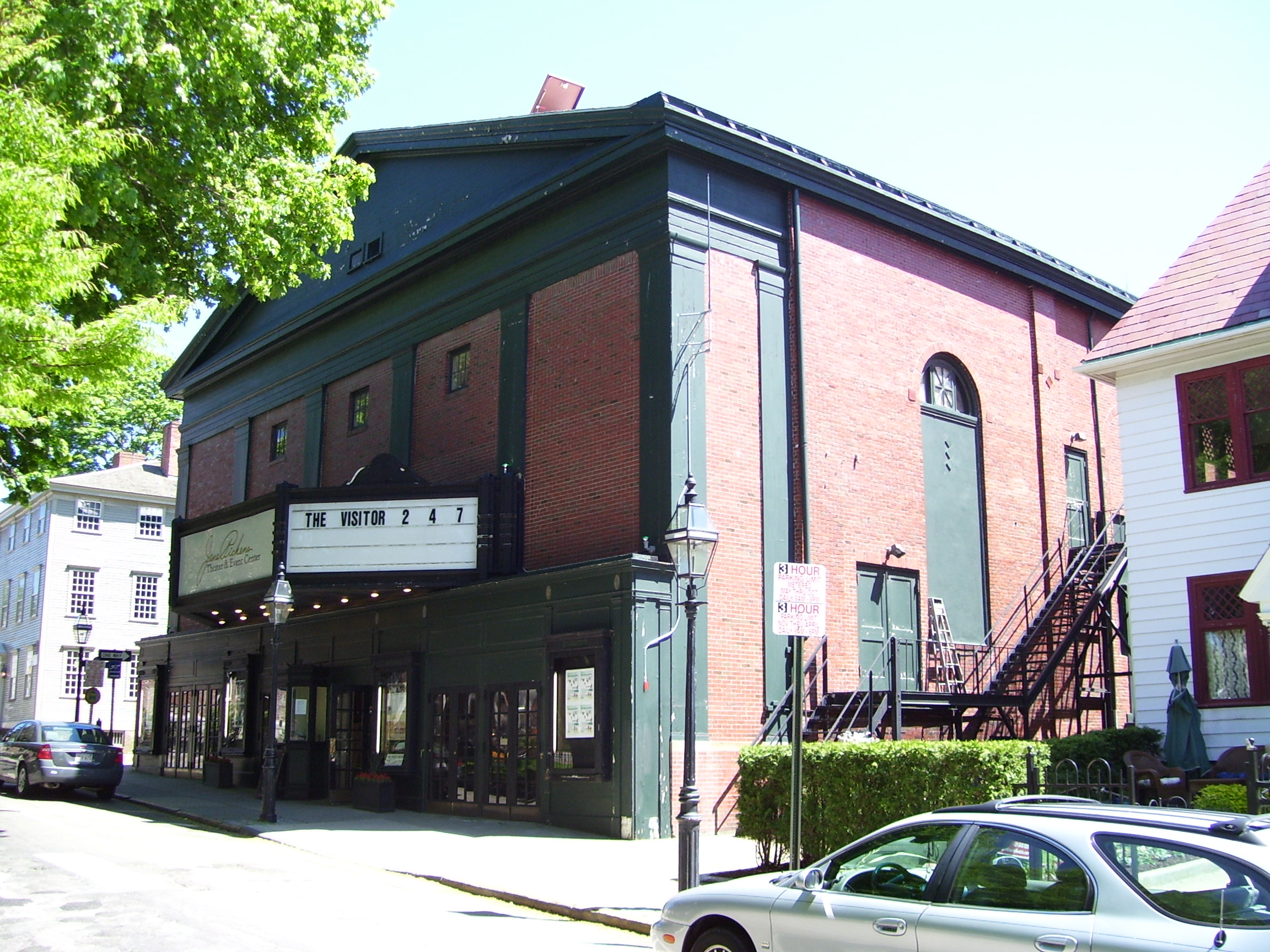
Jane Pickens Theater

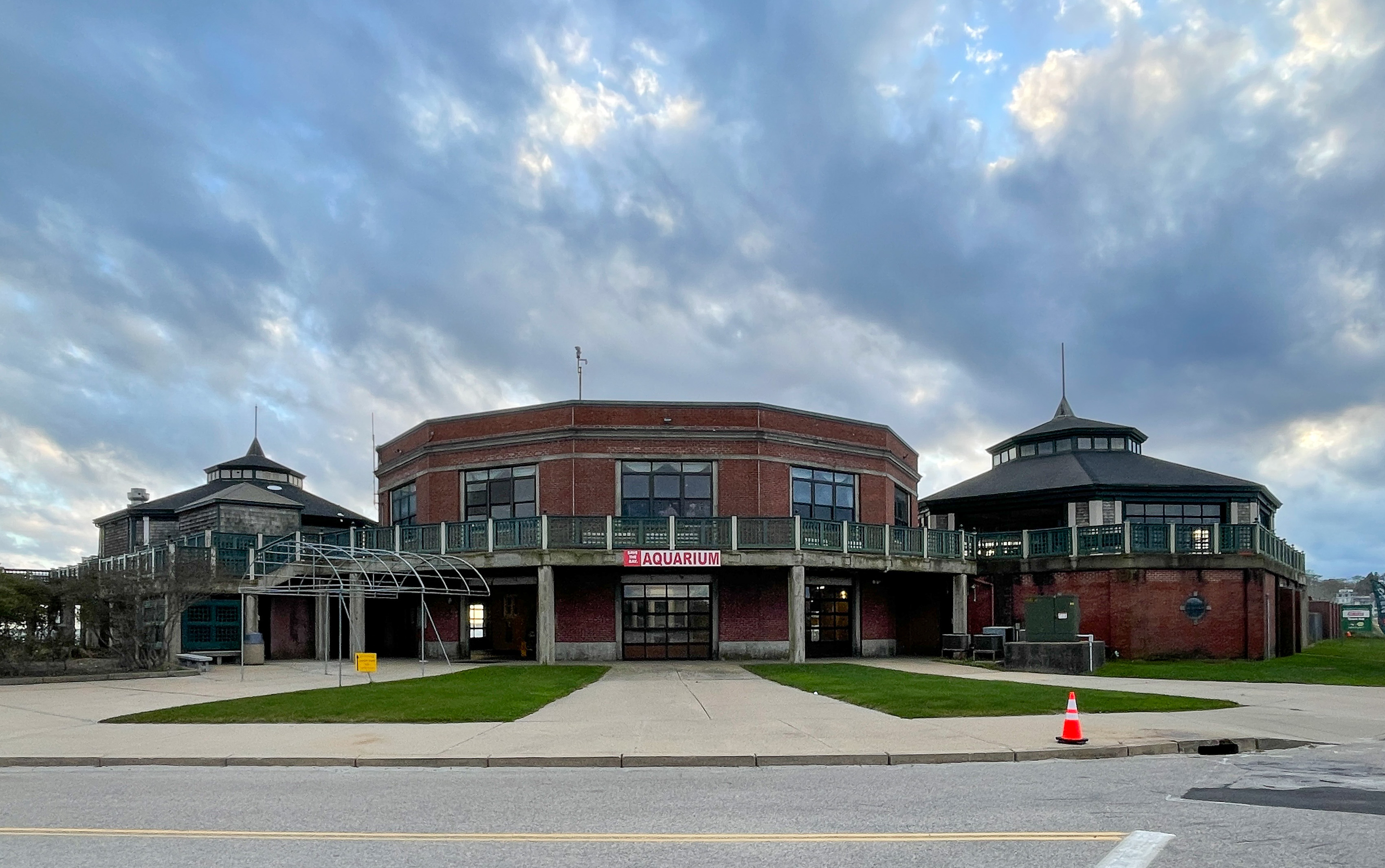
Former location of the Save The Bay Exploration Center and Aquarium at Easton's Beach

== Sports and recreation ==
Because of its history as a summer playground for the wealthy, Newport has played a major role in the history and development of several sports. The League of American Wheelmen was formed in Newport in 1880. The first U.S. national tennis championships were held in 1881 on grass courts at the Newport Casino. The first U.S. Open golf tournament was played in 1895 at the Newport Country Club. The America's Cup sailing races were held in Newport from 1930 to 1983.

=== Sailing ===
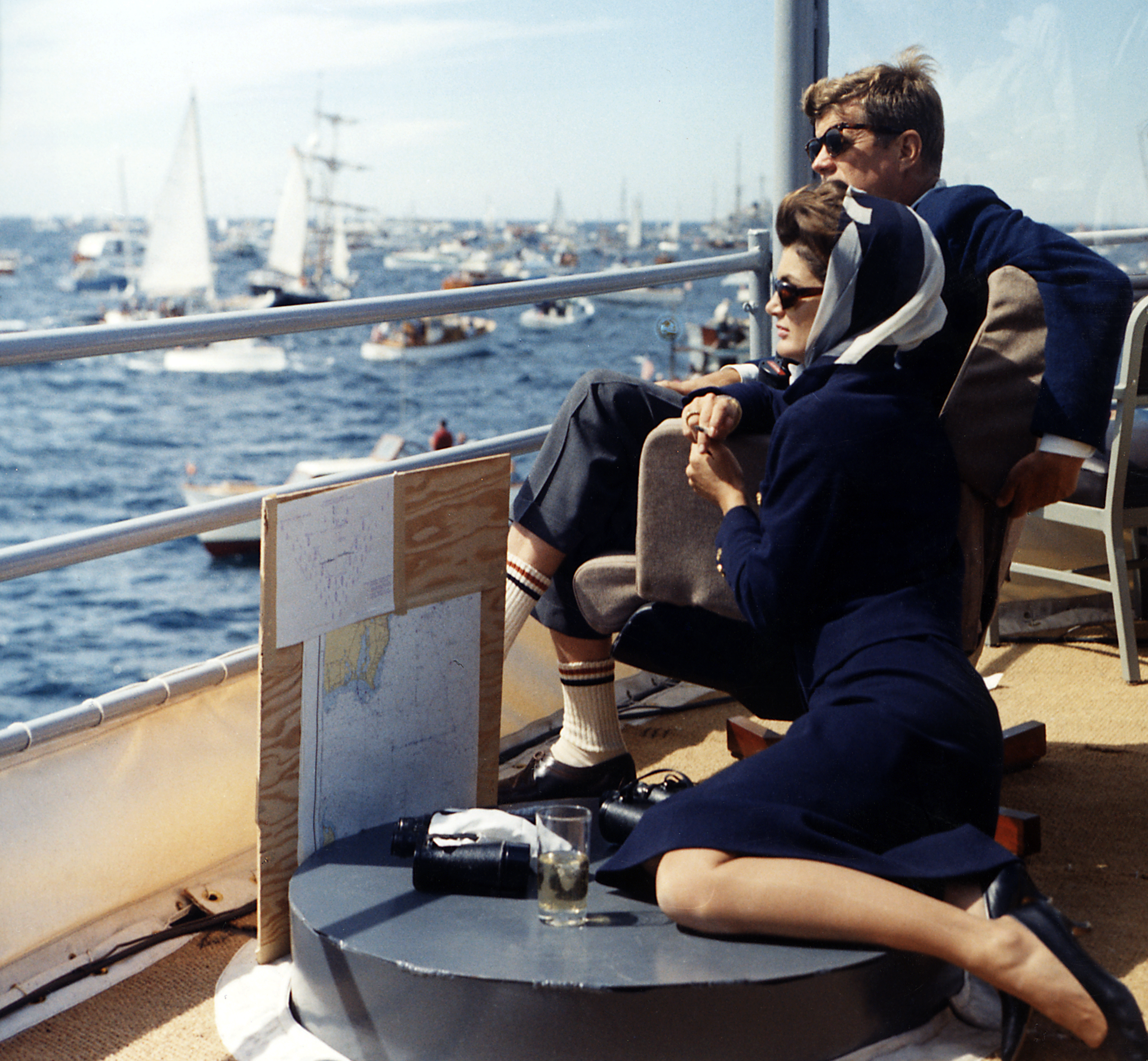
John. F. Kennedy and Jacqueline Kennedy Onassis watch the 1962 America's Cup races off Newport

Newport is sometimes referred to as the "Sailing Capital of the World". The city was chosen as the new home of the National Sailing Hall of Fame which moved from Annapolis, Maryland in 2019. Several sailing clubs are based in the city, including the New York Yacht Club and the Ida Lewis Yacht Club.

Newport was the site of the America's Cup sailing races from 1930 to 1983, and it remains the starting point of the biannual 635 nautical-mile Newport Bermuda Race.

=== Tennis ===
Newport Casino was the site of the earliest American lawn tennis championships. Since 1954 it has housed the International Tennis Hall of Fame. The Newport Casino also hosted the first Newport Jazz Festival in 1954. The Hall of Fame Open has been held every July since 1976, during the week following Wimbledon. The week also includes annual inductions into the Hall of Fame.

=== Golf ===
Newport is home to the Newport Country Club, which hosted both the first U.S. Amateur Championship and the first U.S. Open in 1895. More recently, the Newport Country Club hosted the 1995 Men's US Amateurs and the 2006 U.S. Women's Open.

=== Bicycling ===
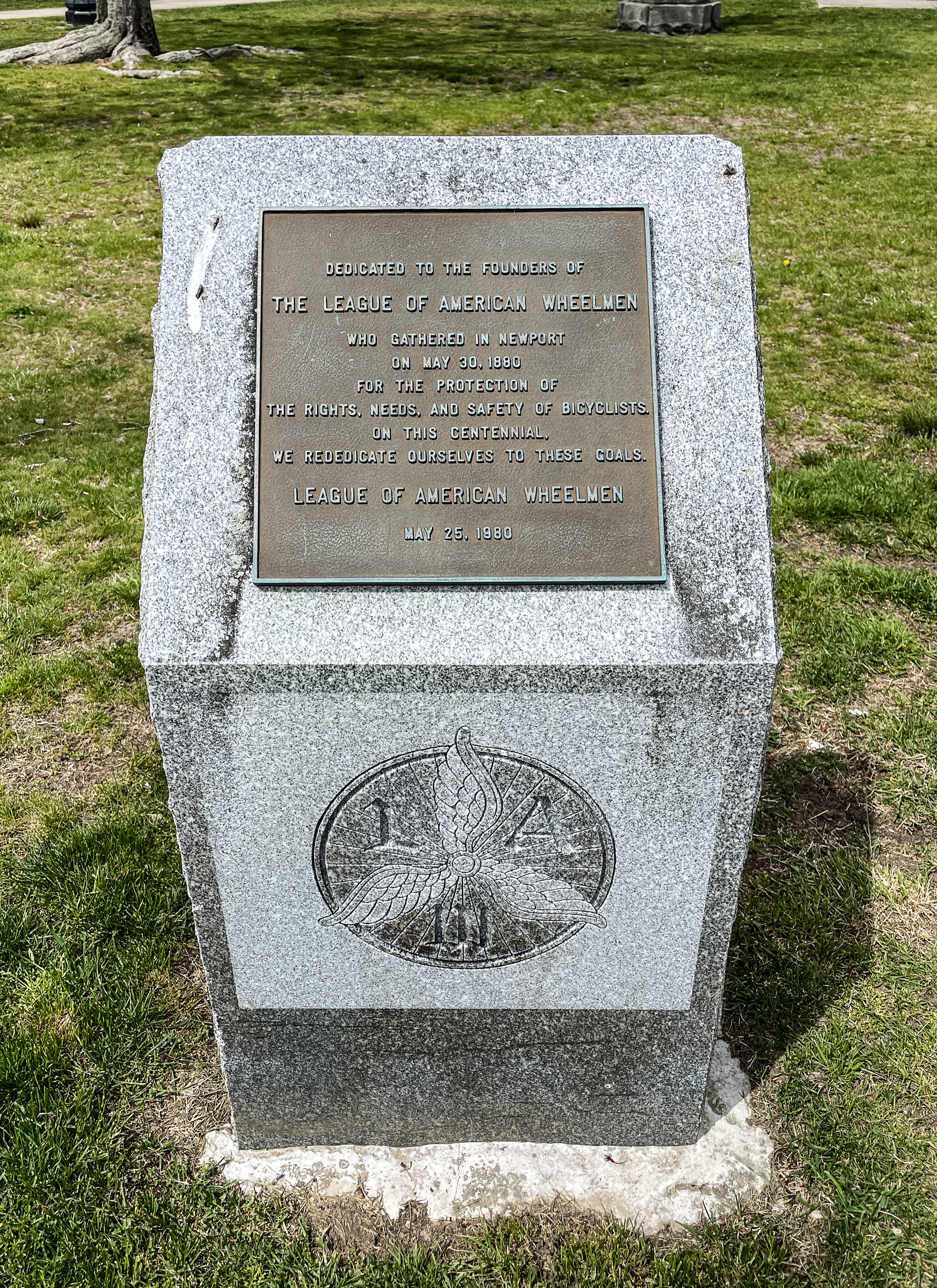
A memorial in Newport's Touro Park commemorates the centennial of the founding of the League of American Wheelmen

In the late nineteenth century, Newport became the center of an emerging pastime for young, athletic, upper-class men: bicycling. On May 29, 1880, representatives of 31 cycling clubs convened in Newport to hold a parade and meeting, and formed the League of American Wheelmen, the first national bicycling organization. The League was instrumental in establishing the Good Roads Movement.

In fall 2013, Newport was designated a Bronze Bicycle Friendly Community by the League of American Bicyclists.

=== Baseball ===
Downtown Newport is home to Cardines Field, one of the oldest ballparks in the country. Since 2001, the venue has played host to the Newport Gulls, a collegiate summer baseball team. Cardines Field has hosted the New England Collegiate Baseball League's All-Star Game and Home Run Derby four times, in 2005, 2010, 2016, and 2021.

Since its formation in 1919, the amateur George Donnelly Sunset League has played at Cardines Field. Salve Regina University also plays select baseball games at the park.

=== Other sports ===
Brenton Point State Park is the site of the annual Brenton Point Kite Festival.

The annual Citizens Bank Pell Bridge Run is held every Fall to raise money for local charities.

== Beaches and parks ==
Newport Parks

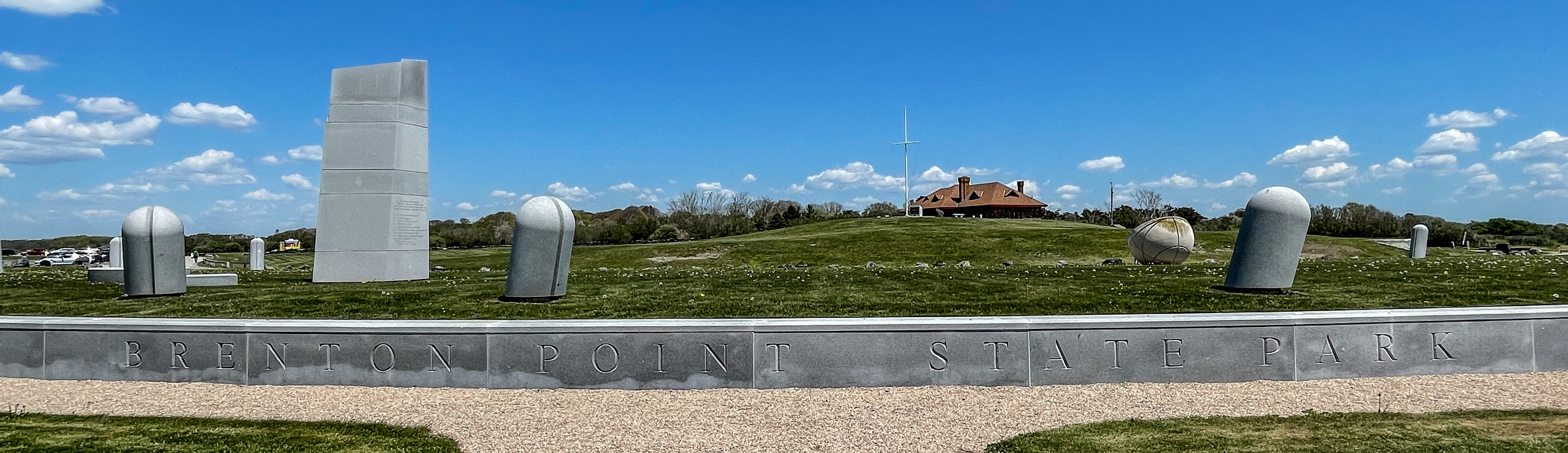
Brenton Point State Park

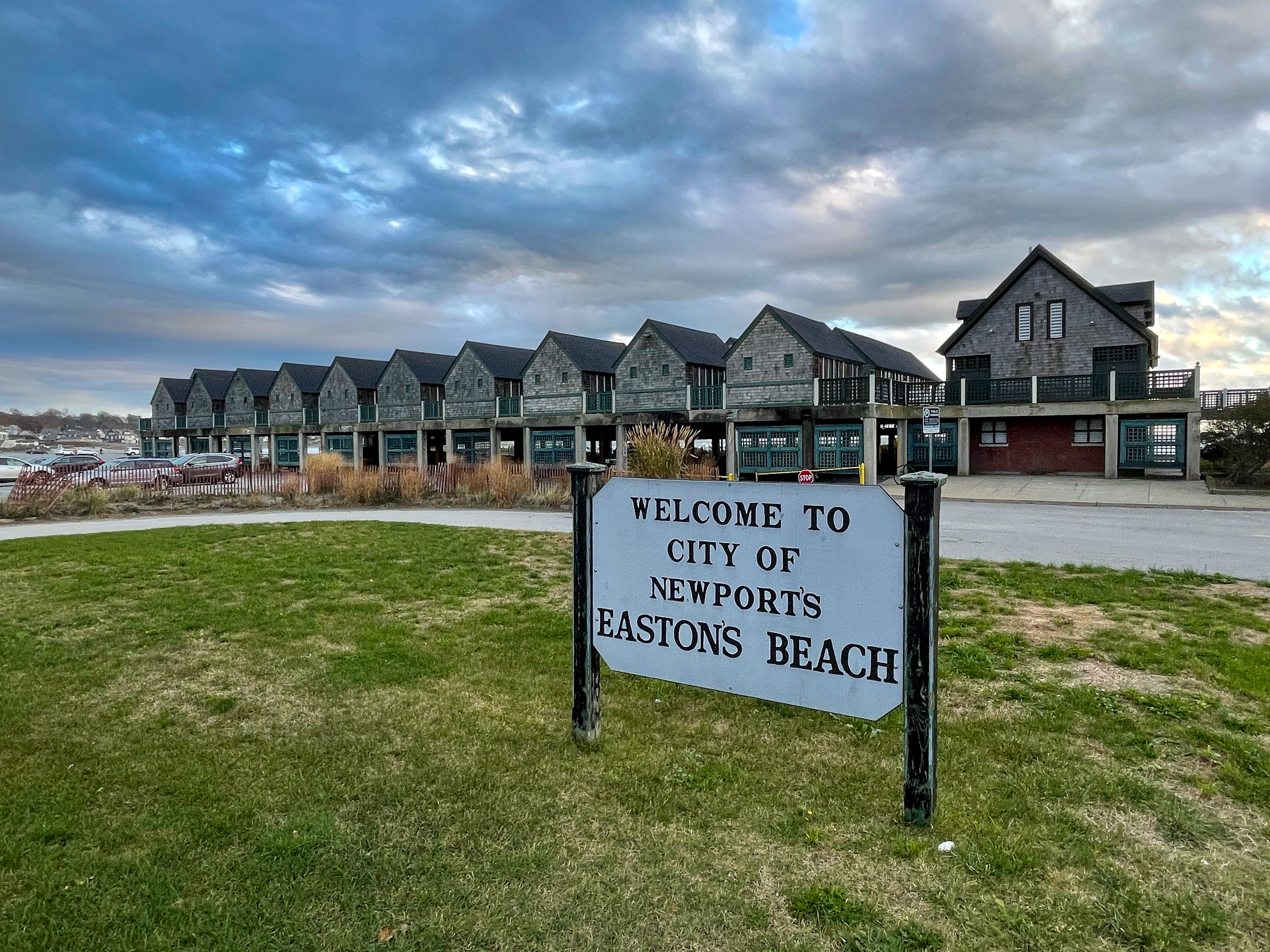
Easton's Beach

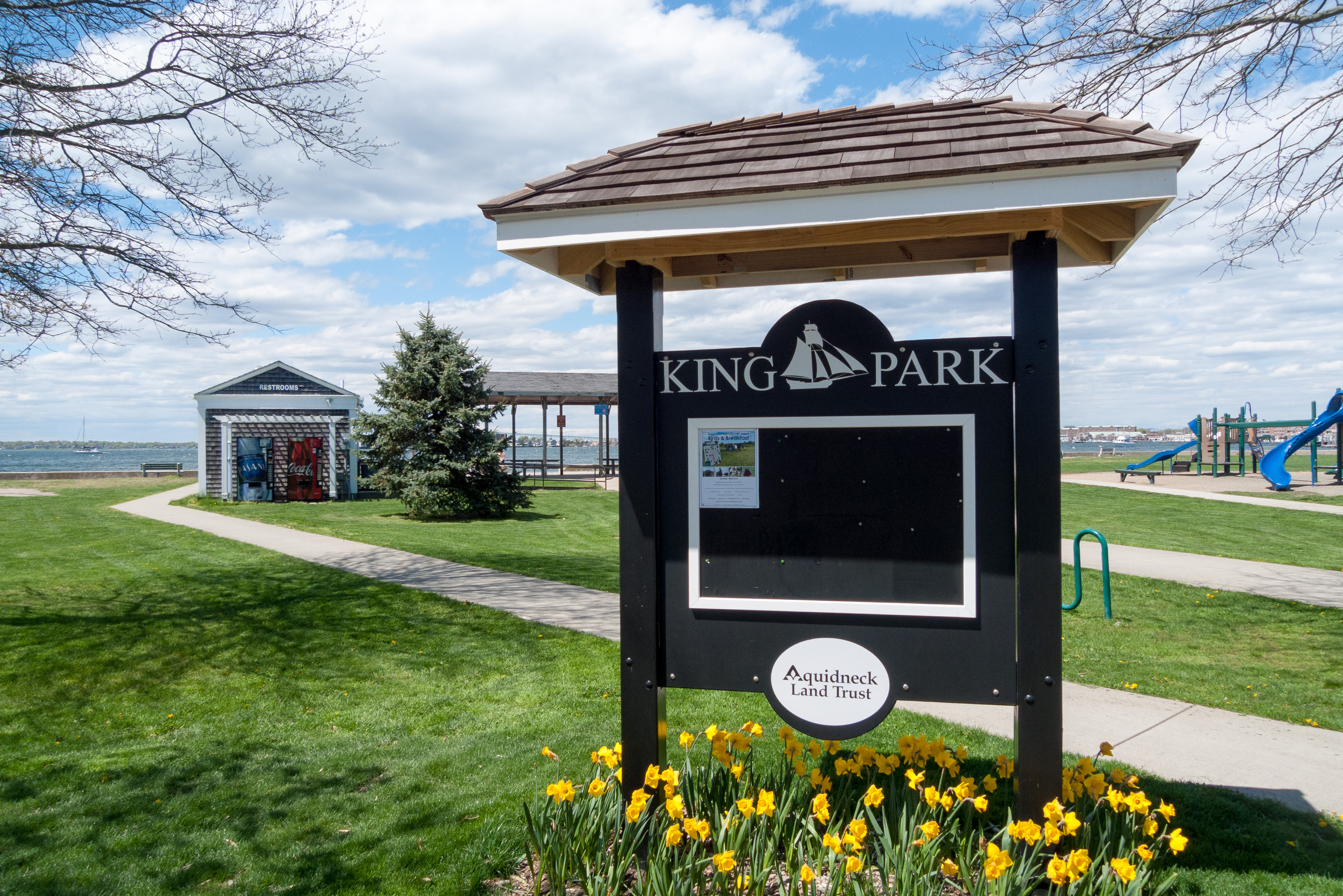
King Park

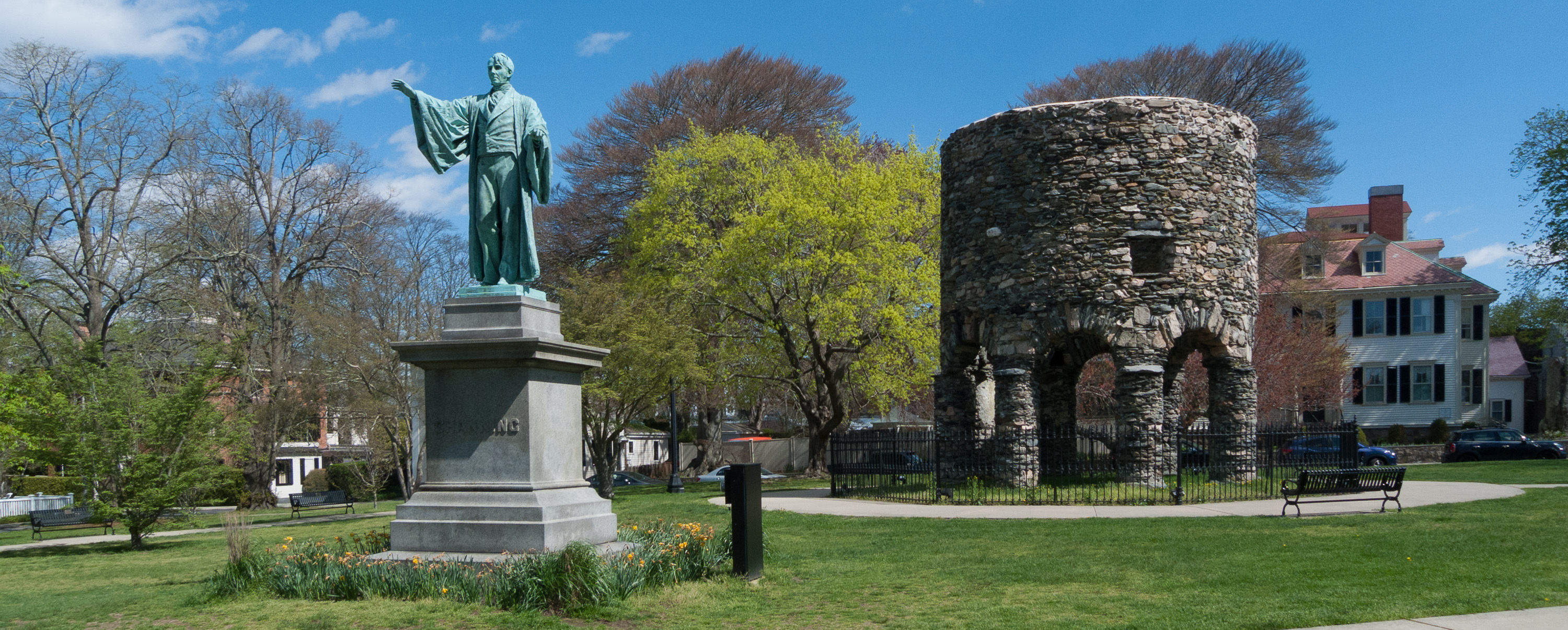
Touro Park

Aquidneck Island has several beaches, both public and private. The largest public beach is Easton's beach or First Beach, which has a view of the Newport Cliff Walk. The Cliff Walk is one of the most popular attractions in the city. It is a 3.5-mile (5.6 km) public access walkway bordering the shoreline and has been designated a National Recreation Trail. Sachuest Beach or Second Beach in Middletown is the second-largest beach in the area. Gooseberry Beach is private but is open to the public on certain days of the year. It is located on Ocean Drive, along with the private beaches, Bailey's Beach and Hazard's Beach. In 2014 Maya Lin, the architect who designed the Vietnam Memorial in Washington D.C., completed a $3.5 million renovation of Queen Anne Square Park, titled "The Meeting Room".

== Education ==
=== Primary and secondary schools ===
Newport Public Schools operates public schools for the area including Claiborne Pell Elementary School, Thompson Middle School, Rogers High School, Newport Area Career and Technical Center, and the Aquidneck Island Adult Learning Center. Prior to 2013, multiple small public elementary schools served the Newport community; the Pell School, a consolidation of those schools, opened in 2013.

St. Michael's Country Day School is the only private elementary school in the city. Nearby private primary schools include All Saints Academy in Middletown, The Pennfield School in Portsmouth, and St. Philomena School in Portsmouth. Nearby private secondary schools include Portsmouth Abbey School in Portsmouth and St. George's School in Middletown.

St. Joseph of Cluny School was formerly located in Newport, on property given by the estate of Arthur Curtiss James to the Roman Catholic Diocese of Providence in 1941. Military families from Fort Adams requested a Catholic school, so St. Joseph of Cluny opened in September 1957 as a kindergarten and added grades until 1965, when the first eighth-grade graduation was held. Later on, the overall population of Newport declined along with the concentration of middle class families. Much of the housing became too expensive for families with young children, and there were relatively few houses sold to new residents. In addition, many families previously going to the school instead sent their children to the Portsmouth School Department. From 2014 to 2017, the enrollment decreased by a quarter. The school administration stated that this decline and the general competition among private schools in the Newport area meant the operation of the school was no longer viable. It closed in 2017. Betsy Sherman Walker of Newport This Week described the closure as a "curveball", unexpected by the community.

=== Tertiary education ===
Post-secondary schools include the Naval Academy Preparatory School, Salve Regina University, Naval War College, International Yacht Restoration School, and the Community College of Rhode Island Newport Campus.

== Economy ==
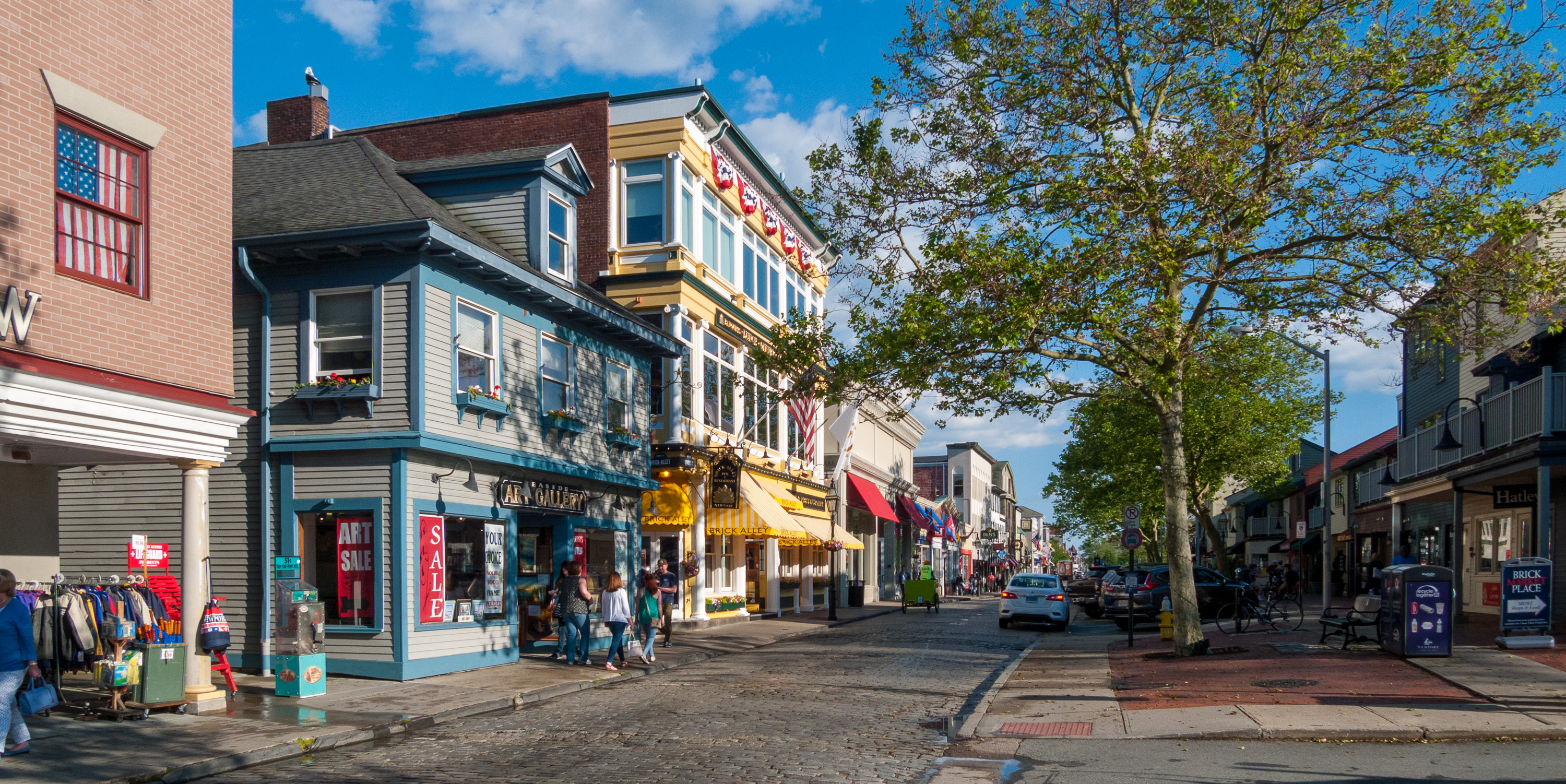
Shopping on Thames Street

While technology and defense are the largest employment sectors in the region, seasonal tourism is a major economic engine of the city of Newport, including hotels, restaurants, and retail. As of 2013, 89.64% of all private employment in the city of Newport was in the service sector. Retail trade was the third largest sector, with 1,341 jobs. Retail and restaurant employment can swell by as many as 1,500 jobs during the peak summer season.

=== Principal employers ===
According to Newport's 2022 Annual Comprehensive Financial Report, the principal employers in the city are:

#	Employer	# of Employees
1	Naval Undersea Warfare Center	4,200
2	Salve Regina University	981
3	Lifespan Newport Hospital	831
4	City of Newport	766
5	Pangaea Logistics Solutions	750
6	Newport Restaurant Group	513
7	Gurney's Newport	231
8	Marriott International	182
9	East Bay Community Action Program	137
10	Preservation Society of Newport County	105

== Sister cities ==
Newport's sister cities are:

- Imperia, Italy
- (Republic of Ireland) Kinsale, Ireland
- Ponta Delgada, Portugal
- Saint John, New Brunswick, Canada
- Shimoda, Japan
- Skiathos, Greece

== See also ==
- Buildings and structures in Newport, Rhode Island
- Common Burying Ground and Island Cemetery (includes "God's Little Acre")
