= Caesar Lyndon =

Early example of the African American literary tradition

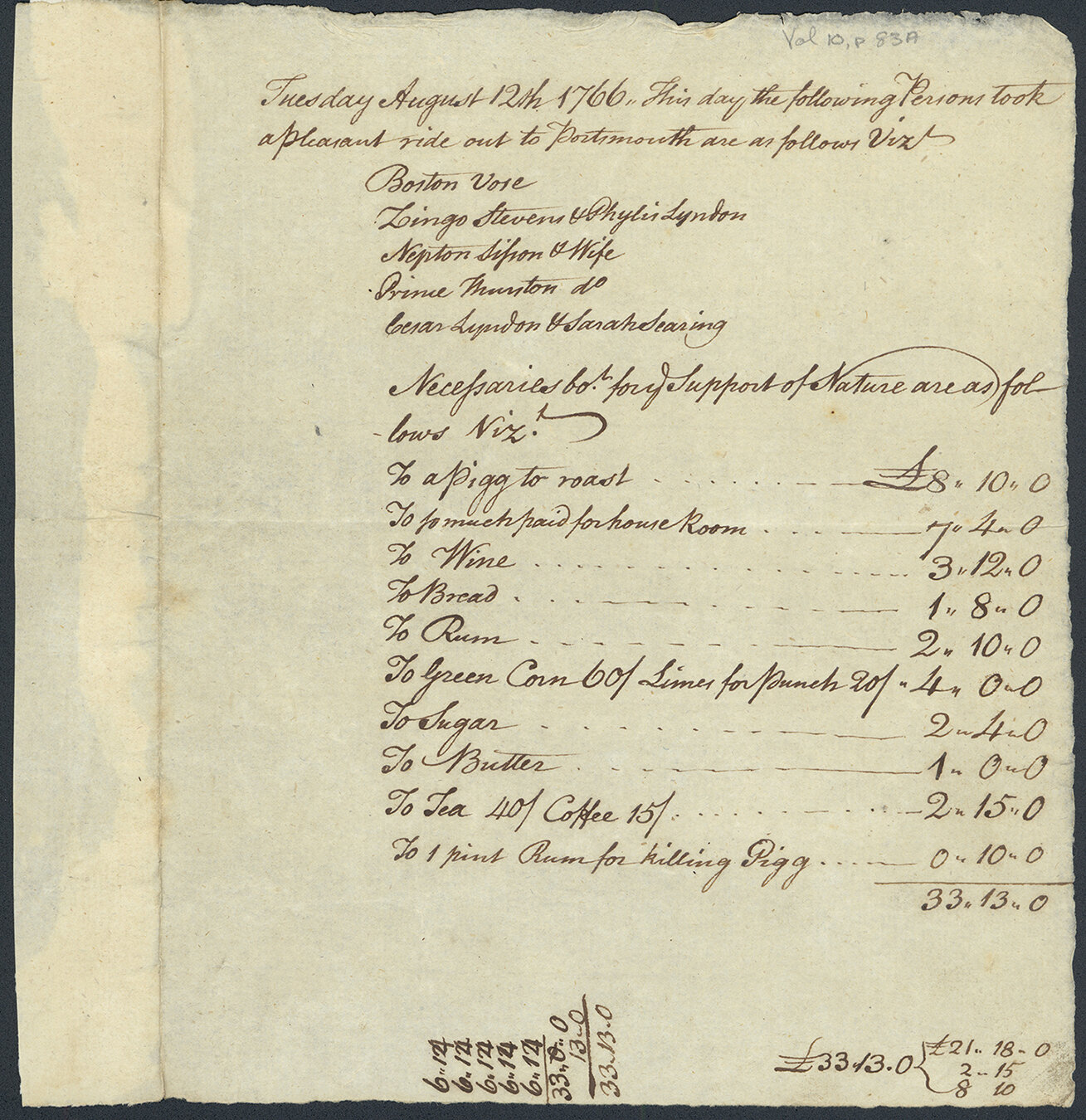
- Caesar Lyndon's Sundry Account Book, 1766
- Occupations: Secretary, purchasing agent
- Years active: 1761–1770
- Employer: Josias Lyndon
- Notable work: Sundry Account Book

Caesar Lyndon (sometimes spelled Cesar, active 1761–1770) was a highly literate Black man enslaved by Josias Lyndon, known for his Sundry Account Book, a valuable historical record of life in Colonial Rhode Island. Caesar carried out Lyndon's business, acting as a purchasing agent and a secretary. His Sundry Account Book chronicles his financial transactions from Newport's famed slave traders like Aaron Lopez, as well as free and enslaved people. By way of double-entry bookkeeping, Caesar itemized the sale and acquisition of goods and services. He also noted deaths, marriages, and a pig roast. This nearly thirty-five-page book represents a lesser-known but fascinating example of the early African American literary tradition of the United States.

Lyndon was not only an enslaved man who could read and write; his penmanship was so good that Caleb Godfrey, a noted slave ship captain, paid him to copy a lengthy letter. Lyndon could also add, subtract, multiply, and divide numbers, particularly currency-- both the Rhode Island pound and the currencies of surrounding colonies.

Lyndon was also a secretary of the Free African Union Society, the first Black benevolent society in the United States.

== Sundry Account Book ==
Caesar Lyndon's Sundry Account Book is a collection of long and short lists of numbers, persons, and events from 1761 to 1771. In fancy cursive script, Lyndon itemized marriages, deaths, and the sale acquisition of goods and services. He notes to whom he sold and separates the debits and credits. Lyndon's account holders are notable slave traders, enslaved servants, and free persons in and around Newport who have come to him for various copying needs, as well as foodstuffs like celery, beets, sow pigs, leather breeches, and ketchup.

In the summer of 1766, Caesar and several friends went on a "pleasant outing" to Portsmouth. He provided a large feast for his guests of a pig roast, corn, bread, wine, rum, coffee and butter. Two months later, Caesar married his picnic companion, Sarah Searing.

== See also ==
- Obour Tanner
- Prince Greene
- Newport Gardner
- John Quamino
