= Rhode Island Slave History Medallions =

Rhode Island non-profit organization dedicated to place-based slave history

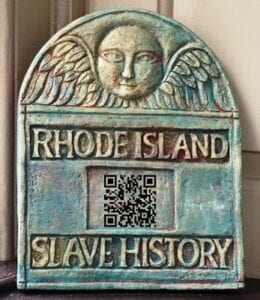
- Example of Medallion, Rhode Island Slave History Medallions
- Formation: 2017
- Headquarters: Newport, Rhode Island
- Executive director: Charles Roberts
- Website: www.rishm.org

Rhode Island Slave History Medallions, or RISHM, is a statewide non-profit organization based in Newport, Rhode Island. RISHM's mission is to raise public awareness of Rhode Island’s dominant role in the institution of slavery. RISHM marks historic sites and homes with a bronze plaque, or medallion, in communities around the state connected to slavery, to commemorate lives of the enslaved, and open a dialogue for racial understanding and healing.

== History ==
Founded in 2017, RISHM was inspired by the late-20th-century urban blight of Newport, Rhode Island. As a child, executive director Charles Roberts played in God's Little Acre, an African and African American cemetery located within the Common Burying Ground, unaware of the significance of the space around him. Determined to inform his community about Rhode Island's role in the Atlantic slave trade, Roberts founded RISHM. Roberts explained in a 2019 article in the Providence Journal, "By marking sites throughout the state that are connected to that past, we hope to make that history easily accessible by telling a more complete story of the cultural and economic development of the State of Rhode Island."

=== Rhode Island General Assembly recognition ===
In 2020, a resolution, RI H7643, was sponsored in the Rhode Island General Assembly by Representatives Lauren Carson, Marvin Abney, Joseph Almeida, Raymond Hull, and Anastasia Williams, entitled "House Resolution Recognizing The Rhode Island Slave History Medallion Statewide Education Program."

The bill formally recognized RISHM as a statewide education program and stated; "The Rhode Island History Medallions Project will make the history of the Slave Trade in Rhode Island more accessible to Rhode Islanders. The Medallions placed at slave-related historical localities serve as awareness educational symbols. In the words of Mr. Lonnie B. Bunch, III, 14th Secretary of the Smithsonian, "Let us use history to inspire us to push a country forward, to help us believe that all things are possible and to demand a country lives up to its stated ideals."

The bill was signed by Rhode Island Governor Dan McKee.

=== Funding ===
RISHM has received funding from the Heritage Harbor Foundation, Channing Memorial Church, BankNewport, and the Newport Historical Society. In 2020, and again in 2022, RISHM received a $10,000 grant from the Rhode Island Foundation.

== Logo and medallions ==
The medallions are what executive director Charles Roberts calls a "soul effigy", or "windows into past cultures ... that inform us what was." The image used for the medallion and logo was designed by Roberts and cast into bronze by Allison Newsome, of Warren, Rhode Island, is a based on a gravestone carved in Rhode Island by a Black stonemason, Pompe Stevens, for his brother, Cuffe Gibbs, in 1768. The lettering was designed by Nick Benson, of the John Stevens Shop in Newport.

The medallion incorporates a QR code, that connects the visitor to RISHM's website, complete with detailed historical information and digital archive.

== Current medallion locations ==
1. Patriot's Park, Monument to 1st Rhode Island Regiment, Portsmouth, Rhode Island
2. Bowen's Wharf, Newport, Rhode Island
3. Smith's Castle, North Kingstown, Rhode Island
4. Linden Place, Bristol, Rhode Island
5. East Ferry Wharf, Jamestown, Rhode Island
6. William Ellery Channing and Duchess Quamino House, Newport, Rhode Island
7. James Driscoll House, Warren, Rhode Island
8. Eddy-Cutler House, Warren, Rhode Island

== See also ==
- Kingston Pease
- Prince Greene
- 1st Rhode Island Regiment
- James DeWolf
