= Obour Tanner =

Correspondent of Phillis Wheatley

- Baptised: July, 1768
- Died: June 21, 1835; Newport, Rhode Island
- Known for: Correspondence with Phillis Wheatley

Obour Tanner, also spelled Abour or Arbour (c. 1750 — June 21, 1835), was an enslaved African woman who lived in Newport, Rhode Island. Tanner was a regular correspondent of poet Phillis Wheatley, and the only correspondent of Wheatley's that was of African descent. Tanner acted as an agent for Wheatley in Newport and made the largest known order of Wheatley's Poems on Various Subjects, Religious and Moral in 1773.

== Early life ==
James Tanner slave auction advertisement, Newport Mercury, October 17, 1758

Obour Tanner was enslaved by silversmith and slave trader James Tanner, of Newport, Rhode Island some time in the early 1760s. James Tanner had been dismissed from a church in Boston, and joined the First Congregational Church in Newport in 1758. In that same year, Tanner advertised in the Newport Mercury for an auction of enslaved Africans "just imported from Africa." Obour was baptized and admitted as "a servant of James Tanner" into the First Congregational Church in July 1768. It was common custom at this time to be baptized at the age of eighteen, so Tanner may have been born in 1750. Wheatley's biographer, John Shields, suggests that perhaps Tanner and Wheatley traveled the Middle Passage together, aboard the same ship in 1761, the Phillis.

Author Martha Bacon, writing in 1964, claimed that Tanner met with Harriet Beecher Stowe in her later years and told Beecher Stowe "that she thought she and Phillis had made the journey to America in the same slave ship. Obour also believed that she recognized Phillis when the two met in Newport in the summer of 1770 when Mary Wheatley spent a season in the watering place and brought Phillis with her as maid-companion." According to Michael Monescalchi, Bacon is one of three scholars who claim Wheatley visited Newport in 1770, though none present any evidence.

Literary scholar Babacar M'Bye writes that Wheatley and Tanner used their "brutal separation from their homeland as an urge to create a female community based upon companionship and unity." M'Bye also writes that the "friendship and solidarity that Wheatley and Obour Tanner created out of their shared experience of the Middle Passage reflects a Pan-African philosophy known as the experiential communality of blacks.

== Correspondence with Phillis Wheatley ==
In 1863, six letters from Phillis Wheatley to Obour Tanner were donated to the Massachusetts Historical Society by the wife of William Henry Beecher. Mrs. Beecher stated in an accompanying letter that she had received the letters from Tanner herself. No letters from Tanner to Wheatley have ever been discovered.

As Phillis Wheatley's most frequent letter correspondent, Tanner became one of Wheatley's primary links to the African Diaspora in colonial New England. Evidence suggests that it was through Tanner that Wheatley became aware of the plans made by Ezra Stiles and Samuel Hopkins to send Africans Bristol Yamma and John Quamino as missionaries to West Africa.

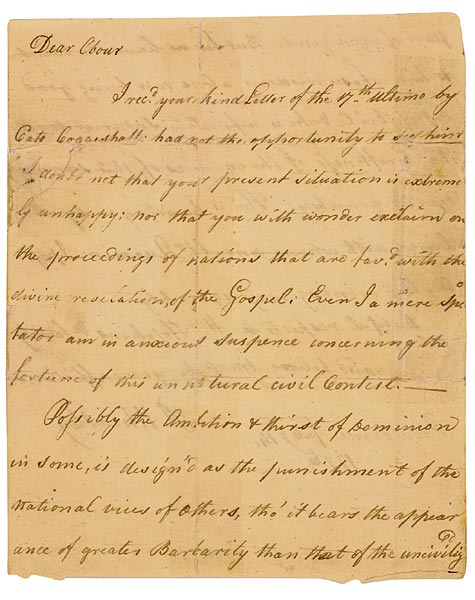
Phillis Wheatley, letter to Obour Tanner, February 7, 1776

According to literary scholar Tara Bynum, in her letters to Tanner, Phillis Wheatley "doesn't lament her black skin or her enslavement. She doesn't belabor her sadness over how black she is or is not. Rather, Wheatley's letters ... are decidedly ordinary glimpses into a friendship between women. Wheatley keeps Tanner abreast of her book sales, her bouts of sickness and asthma, her travels to the country and out of the country, even the death of her mistress, Susanna Wheatley."

== Later life and death ==
On November 4, 1790, Obour Tanner married Barra (also spelled Barry) Collins. The ceremony was conducted by the Reverend Samuel Hopkins in the First Congregational Church in Newport.

In 1809, following in the footsteps of the Free African Union Society, which was founded in Newport in 1780, Obour Tanner helped to found the African Female Benevolent Society, a mutual aid society dedicated to literacy education of Black people.

In 1863, Obour Tanner's letters were donated to the Massachusetts Historical Society by the wife of William Henry Beecher. In an accompanying letter, Mrs. Beecher described Tanner in her later years; "She was then a very little, very old, very infirm, very, very black woman, with a great shock of the whitest of wool all over her head. ... She died in the odor of sanctity ... an uncommonly pious, sensible, and intelligent woman, respected and visited by every person in Newport who could appreciate excellence."

Obour Tanner died in Newport on June 21, 1835.
