= Kingston Pease =

Prominent member of the free Black community of 18th century Newport, Rhode Island

Kingston Pease (sometimes spelled Pees, Peas, or Peares), was a property owner and prominent member of the free Black community of 18th-century Newport, Rhode Island. Along with Newport Gardner, Zingo Stevens, and Caesar Lyndon, Pease formed the Free African Union Society in 1780. In 1789, he was excommunicated from the Second Baptist Church for having a child with Anne Mackumber, a white woman.

== Early life ==
In 1755 almost one quarter of Newport's population was enslaved, and most had been born in Africa. Kingston Pease's name suggests that he was born in Africa and forced into enslavement in either Kingston, Jamaica or Kingston, Rhode Island. This was common practice, see: Newport Gardner. It was also common practice for formerly enslaved people to use the last name of the slaveholder or former slaveholder, making it very likely that Kingston had been enslaved by the wealthy merchant and slave trader Simon Pease.

Simon Pease (1695–1769) was a slave trader from Newport, Rhode Island, and one of the city's richest merchants. Between 1759 and 1766, he financed five voyages to the coasts of West Africa to purchase enslaved people. In 1764, he was one of the original signers of the charter of the College of the Colony of Rhode Island and Providence Plantations, later known as Brown University. Sometime before 1769, Simon Pease enslaved Kingston Pease, probably through one of his voyages to the West African coast.

== Freedom ==
Kingston Pease likely gained his freedom after the death of Simon Pease in 1769. In May of that year, "Kingston Peares Negro" was baptized and became a member of the Second Baptist Church of Newport, Rhode Island.

== Second Baptist Church ==
Kingston Pease was baptized in 1769 and became a member of the Second Baptist Church of Newport, Rhode Island. Though this was a mostly white congregation, Pease would not have been the first Black member. The church admitted Black people as early as 1736. Ten people of African ancestry and three Native Americans were baptized and admitted to the church between 1730 and 1750. According to church records, between 1766 and 1776, twenty more Black people were admitted to the church. Pease remained a member in good standing within the church for more than a decade, without any recorded difficulties.

In February 1781 a church meeting was called to order "Kingston Pees a Black Brother to appear at our next Church Meeting to account for his Conduct on Account of his keeping Company with a White Girl and Wanting to Marry her contrary to the Distinctions God had made." Pease attended a March meeting, and, according to the clerk, "did not appear in any Shape to be convinced of any Error in keeping Company with a White Girl, & wanting to Marry her; Moreover he seem'd rather to blame his Brethren than himself." After this meeting, the council of church members (made up of seventeen men, six of them Black) decided to allow more time for Pease to consider his actions and to respond to the church's objection to his relationship.

In a March 1781 church meeting, Kingston Pease came before the church members and "confessed his Error in Sining [sic] against God and Wounding his Brethren," expressing a hope that "his Brethren would forgive him and Receive him in Fellowship again." After this, the church officially forgave him and restored him to membership status, "without one Dissenting Voice." About eighteen months later, in October 1782, it had become clear to the church members that Pease had not ended his relationship with the "White Woman" now identified as Anne Mackumber, who was now pregnant, indicating his earlier confession had not been genuine. The church moved quickly to excommunicate him, writing "Our Black Brother, Kingston Pees, Appeared and did not Deny the Accusation brought against him, respecting Ann Mackumber, A White Woman being with Child by him." Once considered by the church's "Black Brother", Pease was now labeled "an Unclean Person," "an Heathen man," and "an Adulterer or Fornicator."

== Free African Union Society ==
In November 1780 the Free African Union Society was founded in Newport, Rhode Island. It is the earliest known free Black association in the United States. The Union provided a variety of support services such as paying for burials and providing widows and children of former members with financial aid. Founding chapters in both Newport and Providence, the organization played an essential role in the survival and continuity of Rhode Island's free Black community, quickly becoming its public voice. Membership also provided some sense of financial stability for Black men and their families.

In 1789 Kingston Pease was elected the Vice President of the Free African Union Society. Upon his relocation to New York City, the Union provided Pease with a letter of recommendation, attesting to his character to help him transition to a new city, writing that "whilst he resided in Newport amongst the free Africans, ... and that he has behaved himself as a good, faithful member of this said society, and as such, we recommend To all our Friends abroad." While he made arrangements for he and his family to relocate, the Union helped him to conduct his business, collecting rent on the property he owned in Newport.

== Later life ==
By 1790 Kingston Pease had relocated from Newport, Rhode Island to New York City. He wrote in December 1790 that "my family [are] all well, both my wife & children recovered very well of the small pox, after a short confinement." In 1791, the Free African Union Society wrote Pease to tell him that his son, Arthur, still residing in Newport, was "very sick ... and said to be in a poor, distressed Condition, almost destitute of the Necessarys of Life." An 1800 census of New York listed Kingston Pease as a free Black Head of Household in the Fifth Ward, probably at 8 Fayette Street in Brooklyn.
