= Quamino =

Quamino is a surname. Notable people with the surname include:

- Duchess Quamino (c. 1739–1804), American baker
- John Quamino (c. 1744–1779), American missionary
