= Samuel R. Honey =

American politician from Rhode Island (1842–1927)

Samuel Robertson Honey (June 14, 1842–February 17, 1927) was born in Peckham, Surrey, England, June 14, 1842, and moved to Newport, Rhode Island at an early age.

Honey served in the United States Army for ten years, spanning the Civil War, and reached the rank of captain. He later became a lawyer and a member of the Democratic party, serving single terms as the lieutenant governor of Rhode Island, the mayor of Newport, Rhode Island, and in the Rhode Island house of representatives.

He died in London, England on February 17, 1927, and is buried in the Island Cemetery in Newport.

== Military service ==
Honey enlisted in the United States Army on August 20, 1860, and quickly rose to become the sergeant major of the 2nd battalion of the 15th Infantry Regiment. He was commissioned as a 2nd lieutenant on 13 August 1862 and served in the Atlanta Campaign and Sherman's March to the Sea. He was promoted to 1st Lieutenant on 17 February 1865.

After the war, he was transferred to the 33rd Infantry Regiment on 13 September 1866 and was promoted to captain on 1 November 1866. He was unassigned following a reorganization of the Army on 3 May 1869 and was honorably discharged at his own request on 7 October 1870.

He later received a retroactive brevet (honorary promotion) to the rank of captain effective 1 September 1864 for "gallant and meritorious service during the Atlanta campaign and at the Battle of Jonesboro, Georgia".

In 1904 he was elected as a veteran companion of the Massachusetts Commandery of the Military Order of the Loyal Legion of the United States, a military society of officers who served in the Union armed forces during the American Civil War.

== Political career ==
After his resignation from the Army, Honey pursued a career as a lawyer.

He was an active member of the Democratic party and was a member of the Democratic National Committee from Rhode Island from 1888 to 1896.

He was elected to one term as Lieutenant Governor of Rhode Island, serving from May 1887 to May 1888 and was mayor of Newport, Rhode Island from January 1892 to January 1893.

He was also a delegate to Democratic National Convention from Rhode Island in 1892 and 1904 and was a member of Rhode Island state house of representatives from 1893 to 1894.

== Freemason activity ==
He was an active Freemason and served as master of St. John's Lodge in Newport.
