= Henry Marchant Farm =

Historic house in Rhode Island, United States

- U.S. National Register of Historic Places
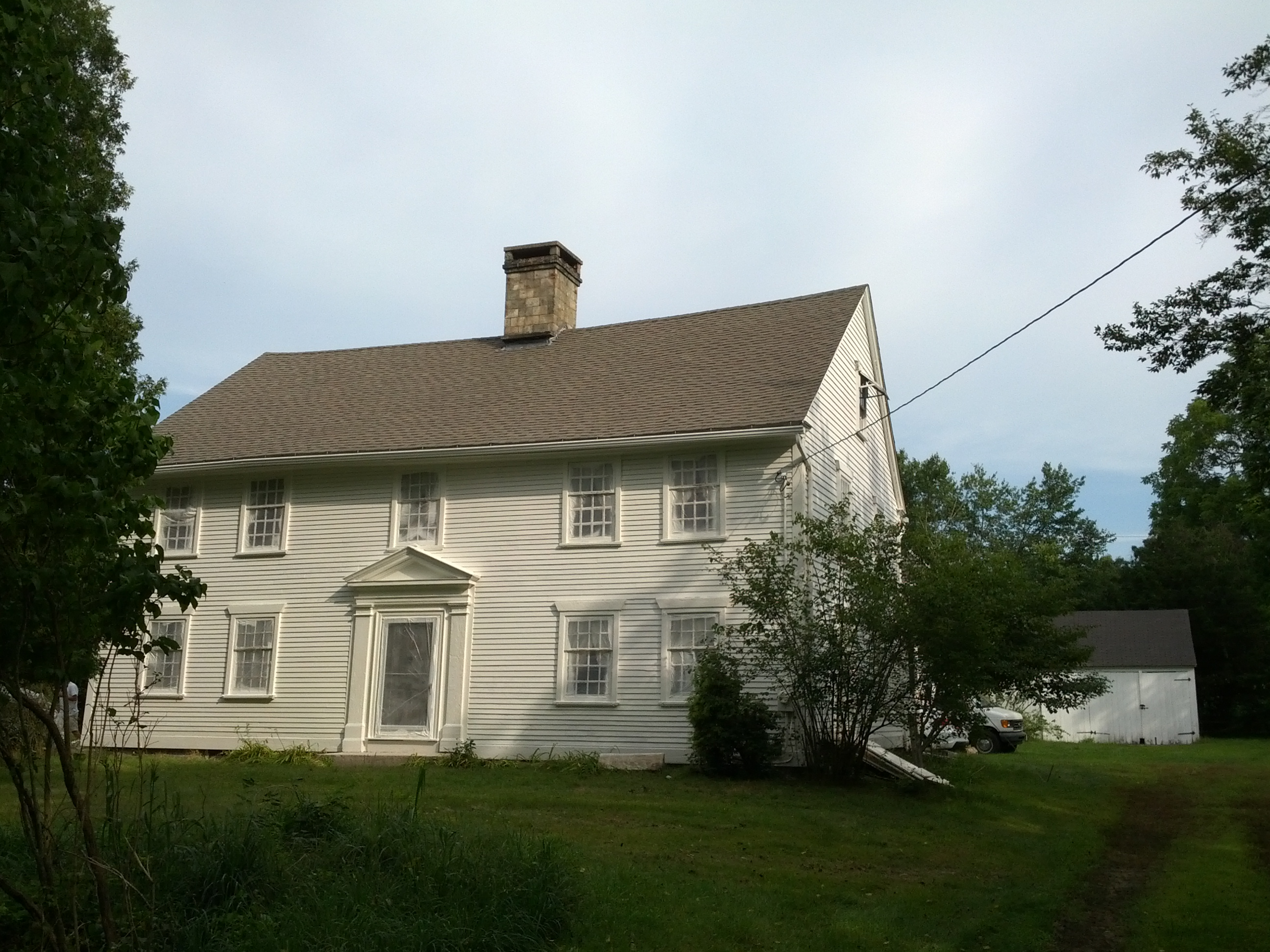
- Henry Marchant Farm as of August 2012

- Location within Rhode Island Location within the United States
- Nearest city: South Kingstown, Rhode Island
- Coordinates: 41.4804°N 71.59647°W
- Area: 90 acres (36 ha)
- NRHP reference No.: 79000009
- Added to NRHP: August 16, 1979

The Henry Marchant Farm is an historic farm on South County Trail (Rhode Island Route 2) in rural western South Kingstown, Rhode Island. The main house of the farm is a 2 1/2-story wood-frame structure, probably built by Joseph Babcock. Construction is traditionally dated to the 1750s, but architectural evidence suggests it may have been built earlier—possibly between 1720 and 1740. The house has well-preserved vernacular Federal styling, including a main entry framed by Doric pilasters and an entablature. The farmstead includes an early 20th-century barn, a carriage house, and an old privy, as well as the family cemetery of the Marchant family. The property was purchased in 1774-75 by Henry Marchant, a Founding Father of the United States and a leading Newport merchant and politician.

The farm was listed on the National Register of Historic Places in 1979.

== See also ==
- National Register of Historic Places listings in Washington County, Rhode Island
