= Garrison Literary and Benevolent Association =

The Garrison Literary and Benevolent Association was a 19th-century association of young African-American males whose purpose was promoting the abolition of slavery and the reformation of society.

== Origins ==
This all-male club began in New York City in March 1834, under the leadership of Henry Highland Garnet, William H. Day, and David Ruggles. 150 African-American youths, all under 20, gathered in a public school for its first meeting.

== Controversy with name ==
The inclusion of abolitionist Wm. Lloyd Garrison's name was controversial and drew immediate reactions. For example, a city official informed the young men that in order to continue using public facilities, they needed to find another name for their club. The defiant young scholars decided to keep the name and move to a private location instead.

"The young men passed several resolutions rejecting the 'uncalled for usurpation' of authority, keeping Garrison in the title, authorizing the Executive Committee to rent a meeting room, and declaring that the name would be passed down 'to posterity.' It was then ordered that a silk society banner be painted. 'It was pleasant to hear the little ones cry -- Garrison! Garrison! forever,' proclaimed the visitor."

== Preamble ==
The preamble to the constitution of this organization was published in The Liberator (Garrison's newspaper) on April 19, 1834.

== See also ==
- Benefit society
- Free African Union Society, Newport, Rhode Island
- Free African Society, Philadelphia
