= Henry Marchant =

American Founding Father and judge

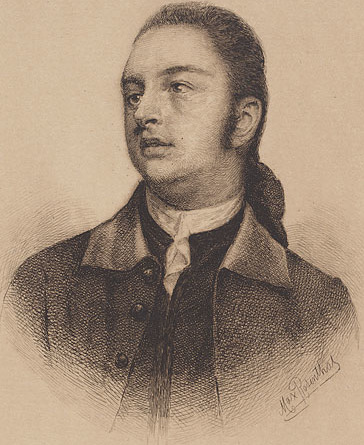
- Etching of Henry Marchant by Max Rosenthal

Judge of the United States District Court for the District of Rhode Island
- In office July 3, 1790 – August 30, 1796
- Appointed by: George Washington
- Preceded by: Seat established by 1 Stat. 128
- Succeeded by: Benjamin Bourne

38th Attorney General of Rhode Island
- In office 1771–1777
- Governor: Joseph Wanton; Nicholas Cooke
- Preceded by: Oliver Arnold
- Succeeded by: William Channing

Personal details
- Born: April 9, 1741 Martha's Vineyard, Province of Massachusetts Bay, British America
- Died: August 30, 1796 (aged 55) Newport, Rhode Island, U.S.
- Resting place: Common Burial Ground; Newport, Rhode Island
- Education: University of Pennsylvania (A.M.) read law

Henry Marchant (April 9, 1741 – August 30, 1796) was a Founding Father of the United States, an attorney general of Rhode Island, a delegate to the Second Continental Congress from Rhode Island, a signer of the Articles of Confederation, and the first United States district judge of the United States District Court for the District of Rhode Island.

== Education and career ==
Coat of Arms of Henry Marchant

Born on April 9, 1741, in Martha's Vineyard, Province of Massachusetts Bay, British America, Marchant received an Artium Magister degree in 1762 from the College of Philadelphia (now the University of Pennsylvania) and read law in 1776. (Note: FJC Bio indicates he read law in 1776, while his Congressional Biography indicates he was admitted to the bar in 1767.) He entered private practice in Newport from 1767 to 1777. He was attorney general of Rhode Island from 1771 to 1777. He was a delegate to the Second Continental Congress from 1777 to 1779. He was one of the signers of the Articles of Confederation. He resumed private practice in South Kingstown, Rhode Island, from 1780 to 1784, also engaging in farming. He was a member of the Rhode Island House of Representatives from 1784 to 1790. He was a member of the Rhode Island convention to adopt the United States Constitution, which ultimately was adopted by a separate convention in 1790.

== Federal judicial service ==
Marchant was nominated by President George Washington on July 2, 1790, to the United States District Court for the District of Rhode Island, to a new seat authorized by 1 Stat. 128. He was confirmed by the United States Senate on July 3, 1790, and received his commission the same day. His service terminated when he died on August 30, 1796, in Newport. He was interred in the Common Burial Ground in Newport.

=== Notable case ===
Marchant presided over West v. Barnes (1791), which was the first case appealed to the Supreme Court of the United States.

== Church and farm ==
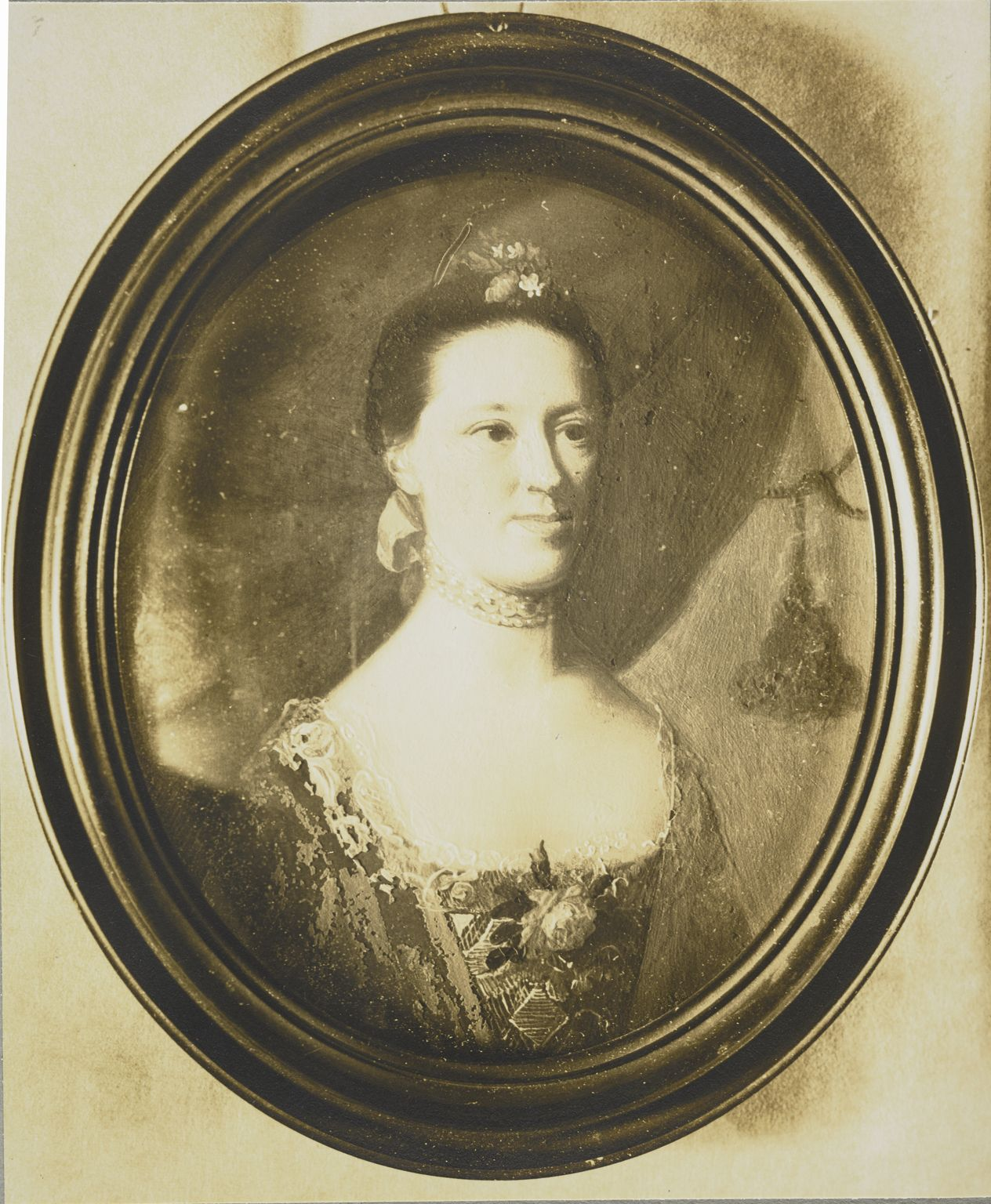
Rebecca Cooke Marchant

Marchant was a member of Second Congregational Church of Newport. His farm, the Henry Marchant Farm, is located in South Kingstown.

== Sources ==
- United States Congress. "Henry Marchant (id: M000125)". Biographical Directory of the United States Congress.
- Henry Marchant at the Biographical Directory of Federal Judges, a publication of the Federal Judicial Center.

Legal offices
Preceded by Oliver Arnold	Attorney General of Rhode Island; 1771–1777	Succeeded by William Channing
Preceded by Seat established by 1 Stat. 128	Judge of the United States District Court for the District of Rhode Island; 1790–1796	Succeeded by Benjamin Bourne
