= Ezra Stiles House =

Historic house in Rhode Island, United States

- U.S. National Register of Historic Places
- U.S. National Historic Landmark District – Contributing property
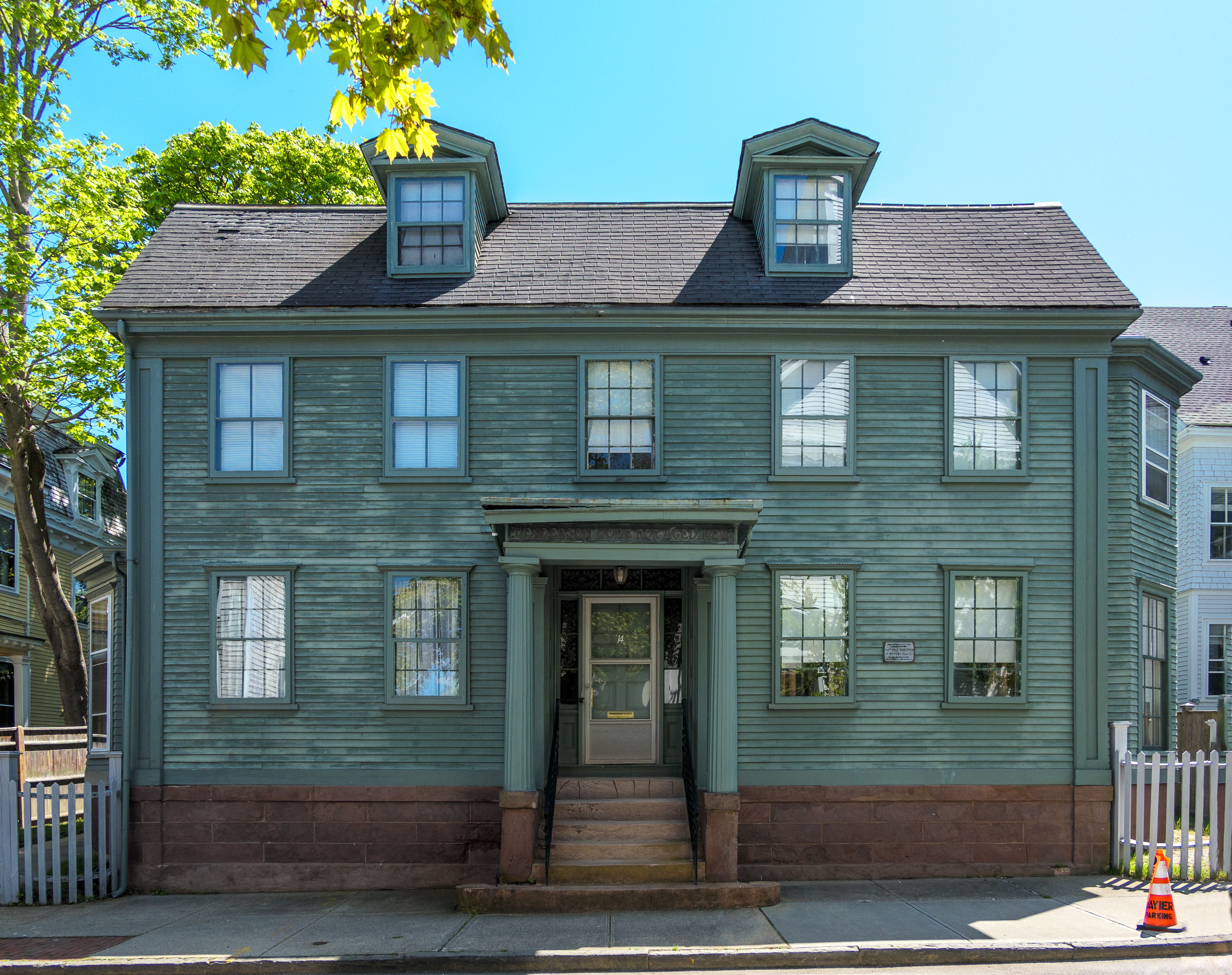

- Location within Rhode Island
- Location: Newport, RI
- Nearest city: Newport
- Coordinates: 41°29′23″N 71°18′50″W
- Built: 1756
- Architectural style: Greek Revival
- Part of: Newport Historic District (ID68000001)
- NRHP reference No.: 72000116

Significant dates
- Added to NRHP: 1972
- Designated NHLDCP: November 24, 1968

The Ezra Stiles House is an historic house at 14 Clarke Street in Newport, Rhode Island. It is a large 2 1/2-story wood-frame structure, five bays wide, with a gambrel roof and two large interior brick chimneys, built in 1756. Originally built facing south, the house was rotated on its lot to face west in 1834, at which time its entry was given a Greek Revival surround.

The house was home from the time of its construction to Rev. Ezra Stiles, later president of Yale University. Stiles lived in the house while serving as a minister for 20 years at the Second Congregational Church on Clarke Street. Stiles owned a slave boy that he acquired through an investment in a slaving expedition. Stiles freed his slave when he left Newport to serve at Yale in 1777. Stiles House is currently a private residence and was added to the National Register of Historic Places in 1972.

== See also ==
- National Register of Historic Places listings in Newport County, Rhode Island
