= Duchess Quamino =

Baker and formerly enslaved woman

- Born: c. 1739
- Died: June 29, 1804 (aged 64–65); Newport, Rhode Island
- Other name: Charity
- Occupation: Chef
- Spouse: John Quamino

Charity "Duchess" Quamino (c. 1739 – June 29, 1804) was a formerly enslaved woman who became famous in the American colony of Rhode Island for her success as an independent caterer. As a child, she was enslaved in West Africa and taken to Newport, Rhode Island. She worked as a cook in the household of a prominent local family, and as a nanny to their son William Ellery Channing. She married John Quamino in 1769, and was widowed in 1779. By 1780, Quamino had gained her freedom, and eventually purchased her own home as a neighbor to her former owners. Her catering business made her a prosperous and well-respected local entrepreneur. She was known as the "Pastry Queen of Rhode Island", particularly famous for her frosted plum cake. At her death in 1804, she was buried in Newport's Common Burying Ground.

== Early life ==
The details of Quamino's early life are unclear. She may have been born in Senegal or Ghana, probably in 1739. Keith Stokes, from a local history organization in Newport, suggests that Ghana (known at the time as the Gold Coast) is most likely because that was the origin of most slave ships arriving in Newport. Quamino's birth name is unknown; her enslavers named her Charity, but she became best known under her nickname "Duchess." This nickname (sometimes spelled "Dutchess") reflected the widely held belief that she was the daughter of an African prince.

Quamino was brought to Rhode Island as a child, on the slave ship Elizabeth. In 1750, she was bought by William and Lucy Channing, a prominent family in Newport. She worked in their household as a cook and a nanny. Quamino converted to Christianity while working for the Channings, and was an active member of Ezra Stiles' congregation at Second Congregational Church, a white church which the Channings attended. Most white churches required black attendees to sit in areas concealed by screens, where white attendees could not see them, but Quamino was not concealed at Second Congregational. She was known as a pious person.

== Marriage ==
In 1769, Duchess married John Quamino, who was enslaved by Captain Benjamin Church in Newport. They had four children: Charles was born in 1772, Violet in 1776, and Katharine Church in 1779, and they also had a daughter named Cynthia. Three of their daughters died young: one at birth, one at the age of 15, and Violet at the age of 18 in 1792. Documentation of their children is sparse; only Charles and Violet are recorded in more than one source. The couple were not permitted to live together. Their children lived with Quamino at the Channings' household, and were baptized with the last name Channing.

John won a lottery and bought his freedom in 1773, after which he attended the College of New Jersey (now known as Princeton University) to train as a missionary. During the American Revolutionary War, John left his religious vocation to serve as a privateer, so he could earn enough money to buy the freedom of his wife and children. However, he died in August 1779, making Duchess Quamino a widow at the age of 40.

== Freedom ==
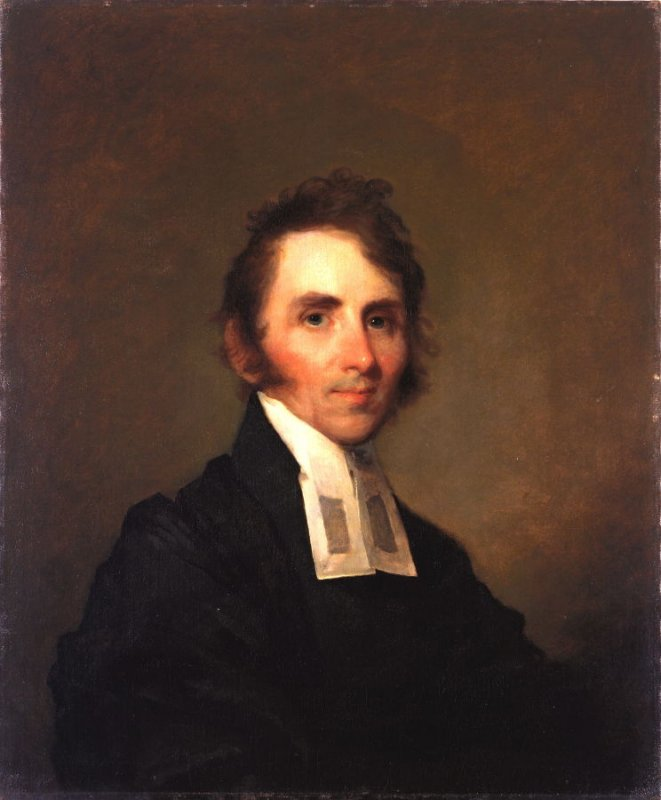
William Ellery Channing in 1815. Quamino was his nanny, and he credited her with shaping his religious and abolitionist views.

By 1780, Quamino was no longer enslaved. Although there is no concrete evidence that she bought her own freedom, local legend attributes her freedom to the success of her business. After being freed, Quamino continued to live with and work for the Channings, now being paid for her labor, a common arrangement for people newly freed from slavery. Quamino worked as a nanny looking after William Ellery Channing, born in 1780, who would later become a Unitarian preacher. He remembered her fondly in his memoirs and considered her influential in his religious and abolitionist views.

Quamino began her catering business from the Channings' house. She delivered cakes to customers and catered to large public events. She became known for her specialty dish, a frosted plum cake. This recipe has not survived; there is no evidence that Quamino was literate to write down her recipes. Based on similar recipes of the time, the "plums" likely referred to raisins or currants, and cake was likely dense like a fruitcake. Quamino catered for events attended by prominent people visiting Newport; secondary sources name George Washington as a guest at one such gathering.

By 1782, Quamino had earned enough money to purchase her own home. She lived on School Street as a neighbor of the Channings and used their large oven for major baking projects. In 1792, Quamino purchased a one-sixth share in the business of the Palls and Biers Society of the African Union, which made her the first black woman invited to join a black male organization in New England. As an entrepreneur, she was a prosperous, respected, and well-connected figure in the community.

== Death and legacy ==
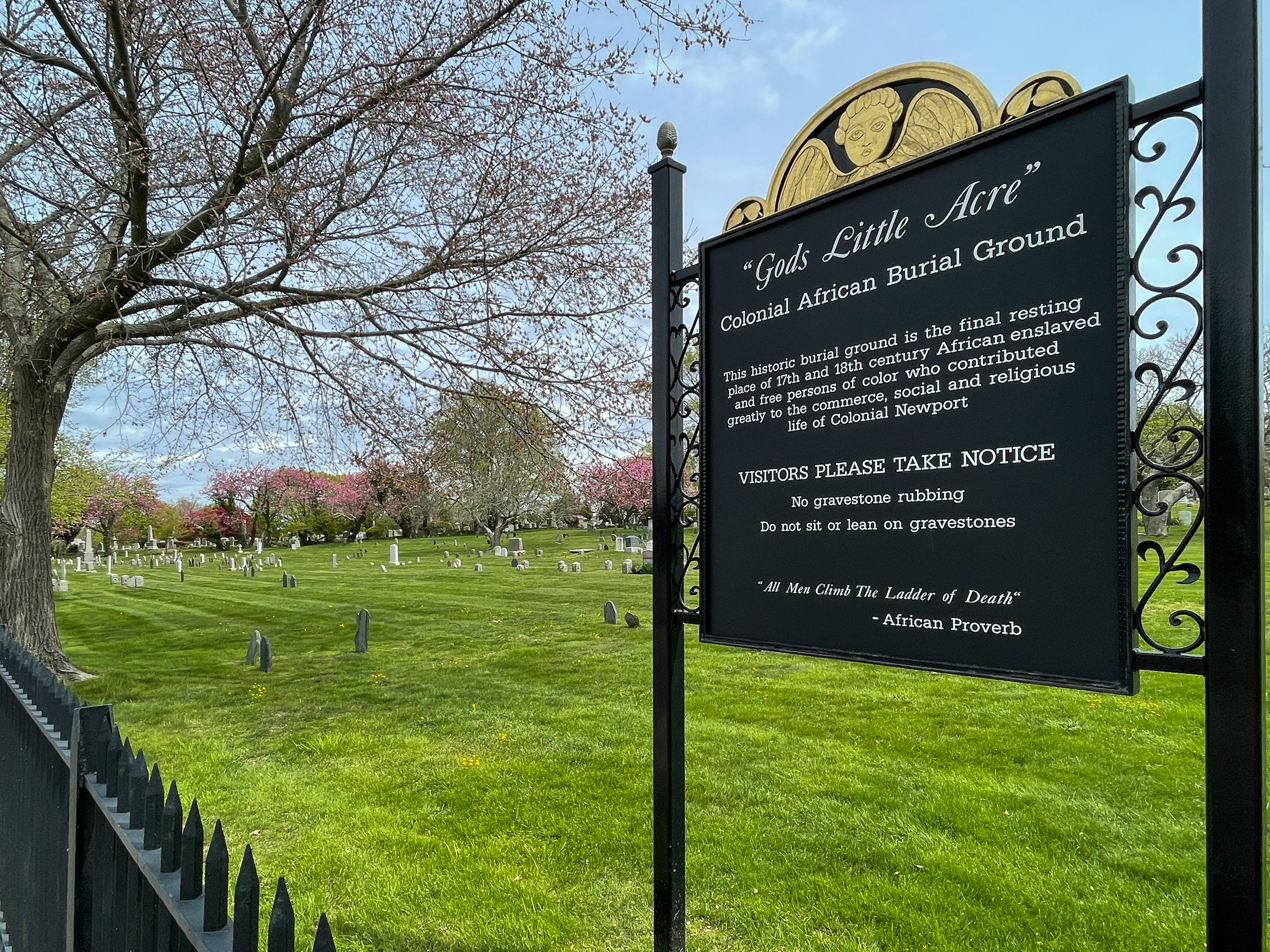
"God's Little Acre", where many Black residents of the colonial era are buried in Newport's Common Burying Ground, including Duchess Quamino

Quamino died on June 29, 1804. A large funeral was held in her honor. She is buried in Newport's Common Burying Ground, in the northern section known as "God's Little Acre". William Ellery Channing wrote the inscription for her gravestone: "In memory of Duchess Quamino, a free Black of distinguished excellence; Intelligent, industrious, affectionate, honest, and of exemplary piety; who deceased June 29, 1804, aged 65 years." In 2017, Quamino's gravestone and that of her daughter Violet were restored. In 2023, the Hearthside House Museum in Lincoln, Rhode Island featured a historic re-enactor portraying Quamino. In 2025, an independent theater, Center Aqyidneck, staged a play about the history of Newport, Rhode Island in the Common Burying ground. Duchess Quamino was portrayed by Rebekah Acquah, playing a central role in the play.
