= Common Burying Ground and Island Cemetery =

Historic burial grounds in Rhode Island, US

Coordinates: 41°29′47″N 71°18′56″W

- U.S. National Register of Historic Places
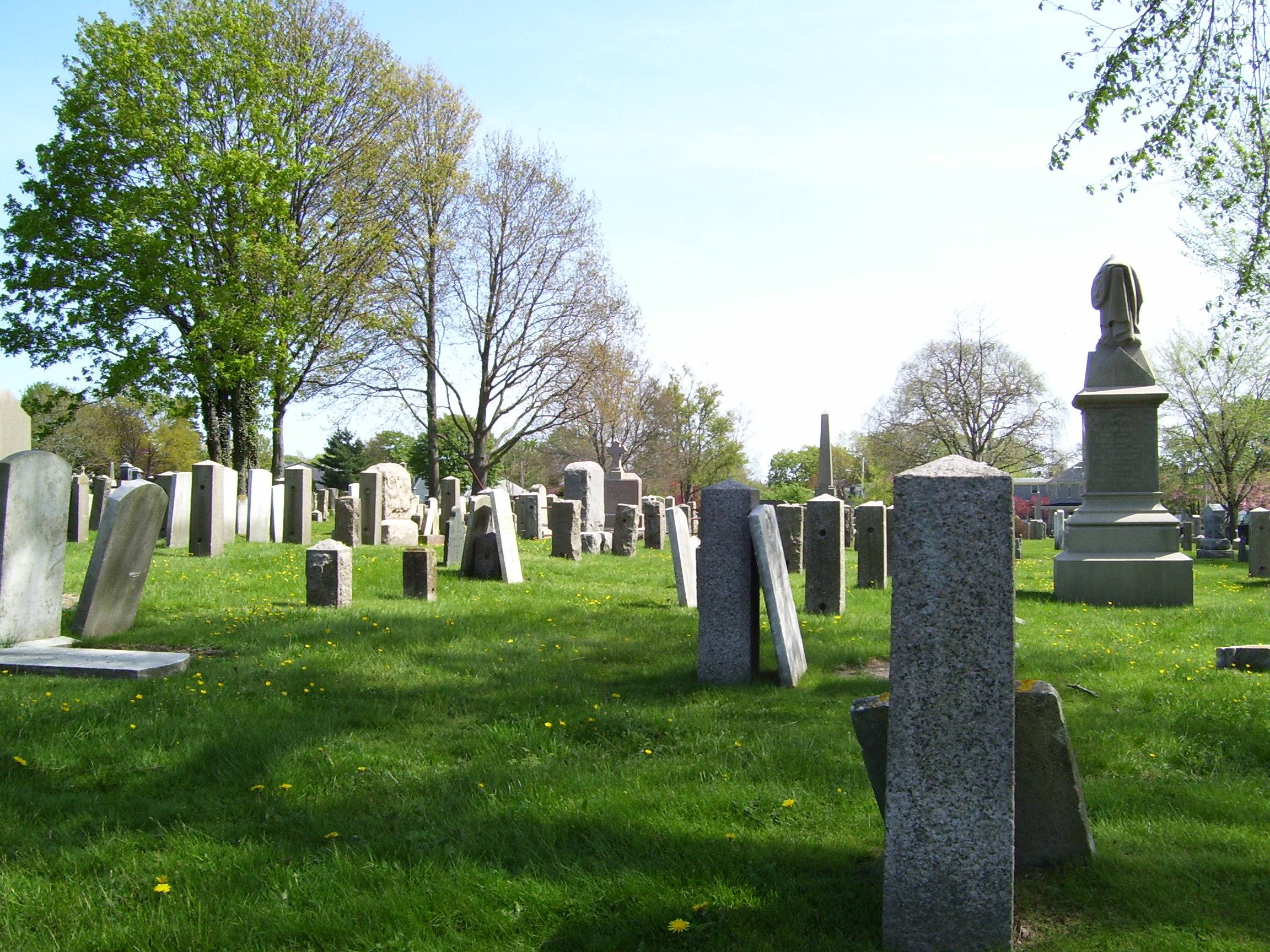

- Location within Rhode Island Location within the United States
- Location: Newport, Rhode Island, U.S.
- Area: 31 acres (13 ha)
- Built: 1665
- Architectural style: Beaux Arts, Romanesque
- Website: www.islandcemeterynewport.com
- NRHP reference No.: 74000044
- Added to NRHP: May 1, 1974

The Common Burying Ground and Island Cemetery are a pair of separate cemeteries on Farewell and Warner Street in Newport, Rhode Island. Together they contain over 5,000 graves, including a colonial-era slave cemetery and Jewish graves. The pair of cemeteries was added to the National Register of Historic Places as a single listing in 1974.

== History ==
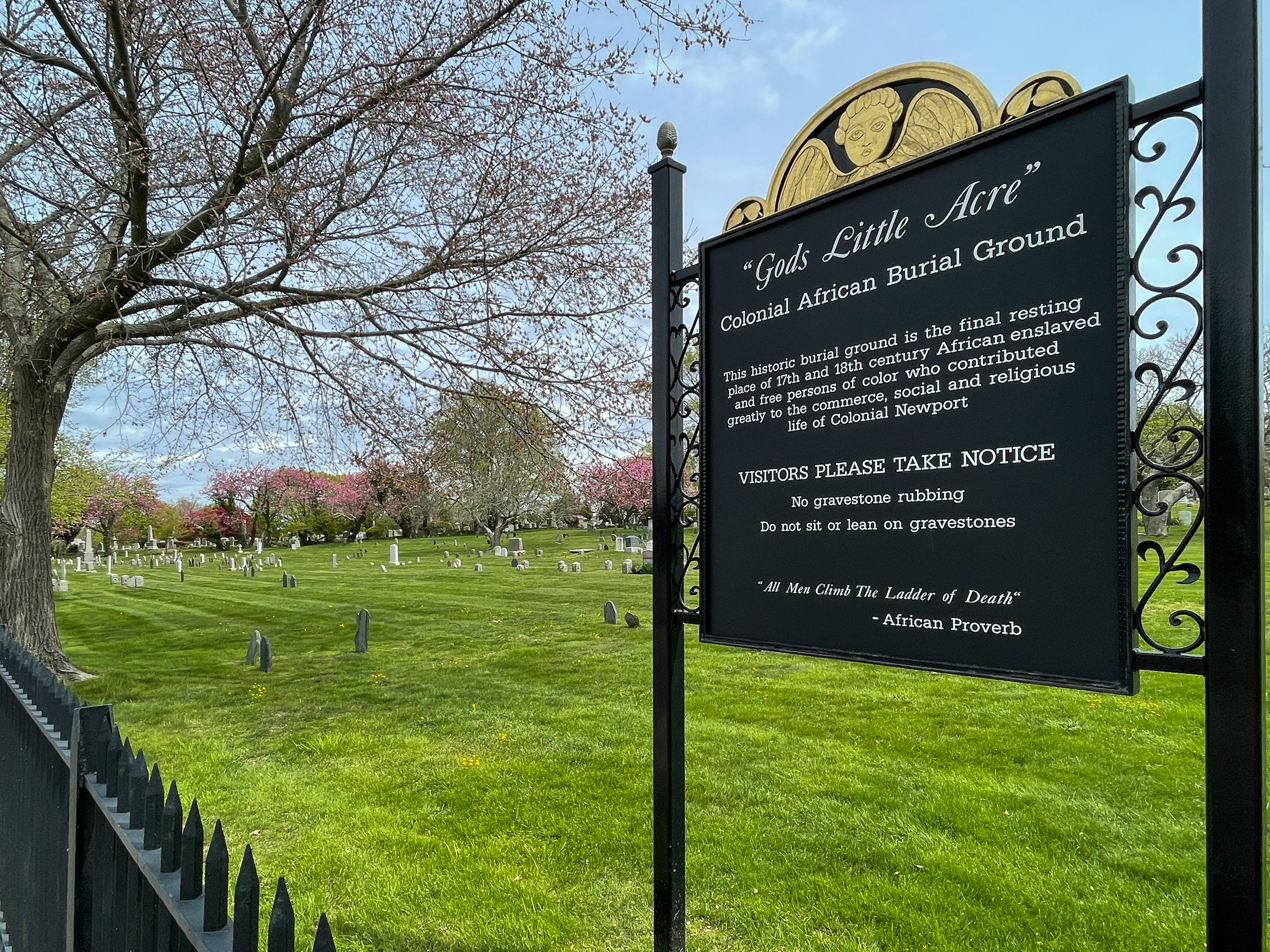
God's Little Acre

The Common Burial Ground was established in 1665 on land given to city of Newport by John Clarke. It features what is probably the largest number of colonial era headstones in a single cemetery, including the largest number of colonial African American headstones in the United States. The predominantly African-American northern section of the cemetery is commonly referred to by local African-Americans as "God's Little Acre".

The Island Cemetery was established by the city in 1836, and transferred to the private Island Cemetery Corporation in 1848. Many members of Newport's most prominent families have been buried there over the years. Notable people buried there include Medal of Honor recipient Hazard Stevens, Commodore Oliver Hazard Perry, Commodore Matthew C. Perry and financier August Belmont.

=== Grave markers returned ===
In 2016, three gravestones were discovered which had been lost for years. One stone, found in Pennsylvania, was a 12 x 24 marker for a 1-year-old child. The others were 1835 stones for a Newport woman, which were found in a Newport yard during a renovation. The recovered stones were reset in the Common Burying Ground in 2016 by the Newport Historic Cemetery Advisory Commission.

In 2017, two more burial stones found in Pennsylvania, those of Violet and Duchess Quamino, were returned and restored. Duchess Quamino, a free Black woman formerly enslaved to William Ellery Channing, had been an active member of Newport's African community.

== Notable burials ==
=== Prominent people buried in the Common Burial Ground ===
- John Howard Benson - Artist and stone carver.
- John Linscom Boss Jr. – United States Representative.
- Christopher Champlin – First Grand Master of the Grand Lodge of Rhode Island 1791-1794.
- Christopher G. Champlin – United States Representative 1797–1801, United States Senator 1809–11.
- Michele Felice Cornè – Painter.
- John Cranston – Colonial Governor of Rhode Island.
- Samuel Cranston – Colonial Governor of Rhode Island.
- William Ellery Sr. - Colonial Deputy Governor of Rhode Island.
- William Ellery – Signer of the Declaration of Independence.
- James Franklin – Printer and brother of Benjamin Franklin.
- Ann Smith Franklin – Printer & publisher, wife/widow of James Franklin (1st woman U.S. newspaper editor)
- Prince Greene - Enslaved African-American who served as a soldier in the American Revolution.
- Ida Lewis (lighthouse keeper) – Heroine of the 19th Century. Recipient of the Gold Lifesaving Medal.
- Henry Marchant – Delegate to the Continental Congress.
- Dutee J. Pearce – United States Representative.
- Duchess Quamino (1739–1804), a formerly enslaved woman, known as the "Pastry Queen of Rhode Island
- Asher Robbins – United States Senator 1825–39.
- Gilbert Stuart – Portrait artist, is not buried here, but is honored on the monument above his wife's grave. (cenotaph)
- Jane Stuart - First woman portrait artist in Newport, and daughter of Gilbert Stuart. Her mother and a few of her sisters are buried there, too.
- William Greene Turner – Sculptor, perhaps best known for his statue of Oliver Hazard Perry in Newport.
- Frances (Latham) Vaughan – "The Mother of Governors," widow to colonial President Jeremy Clarke, and mother of colonial governor Walter Clarke.
- William Vernon – Colonial era merchant.
- Richard Ward – Colonial governor of Rhode Island.
- Samuel Ward – Delegate to Continental Congress and colonial Governor of Rhode Island.

=== Prominent people buried in the Island Cemetery ===
- Hugh D. Auchincloss – Naval officer, government official and stockbroker
- Lillian Barrett (1884–1963) – novelist and playwright
- Janet Lee Bouvier Auchincloss Morris – Mother of Jacqueline Kennedy Onassis
- August Belmont – Chairman of the Democratic National Committee 1860 to 1872 and founder of the Belmont Stakes
- August Belmont Jr. – Developer of the IRT Subway in New York City and the Cape Cod Canal
- Perry Belmont – United States Representative and Army officer
- Gunner George F. Brady, USN – Medal of Honor recipient.
- Captain Kidder Breese, USN – Commander of the Naval Landing Party at the Second Battle of Fort Fisher.
- Brevet Brigadier General Henry Brewerton – Superintendent of West Point Military Academy.
- Melville Bull – United States Representative, 1895–1903
- George Henry Calvert – Writer and Mayor of Newport
- Rear Admiral Augustus Case – Career Navy officer
- William Cole Cozzens – Mayor of Newport and Governor of Rhode Island, 1863
- Henry Y. Cranston – United States Representative from Rhode Island and commander of the Artillery Company of Newport
- Robert B. Cranston – United States Representative from Rhode Island
- George T. Downing (1819–1903) – abolitionist, entrepreneur, restaurateur
- Lieutenant Thomas Eadie, USN – Medal of Honor recipient (buried in Island Cemetery Annex).
- William Channing Gibbs – Governor of Rhode Island, 1821–24
- George Washington Greene – Historian
- John N. A. Griswold – Merchant, industrialist and diplomat
- Captain Samuel R. Honey - Army officer and Lieutenant Governor of Rhode Island
- Richard Morris Hunt (1827–1895) – Noted architect of Gilded Age
- Charles Bird King (1785–1862) – Painter
- Clarence King (1842–1901) – Geologist
- George Gordon King – Congressman
- Lewis Cass Ledyard – Lawyer and Commodore of the New York Yacht Club
- George Champlin Mason, Sr. - Architect and historian.
- Captain Christopher Raymond Perry – Privateer in the American Revolution and naval officer in the Quasi War
- Commodore Matthew C. Perry (1794–1858) – Commander of Black Ships Expedition to Japan in 1853
- Commodore Oliver Hazard Perry (1785–1819) – Hero of the Battle of Lake Erie in War of 1812
- Lieutenant Colonel John Hare Powel – Army officer, Mayor of Newport and commander of the Artillery Company of Newport
- George L. Rives – Assistant Secretary of State
- William Paine Sheffield Sr. – Congressman and United States Senator 1884–85
- William Paine Sheffield Jr. – Congressman
- Major General Thomas W. Sherman – Civil War general
- William Watts Sherman (1842–1912) – Socialite and treasurer of the Newport Casino
- Brevet Brigadier General Hazard Stevens – Medal of Honor recipient and son of Isaac Stevens
- Major General Isaac Ingalls Stevens – Civil War general who was killed in action at the Battle of Chantilly
- Frank K. Sturgis – President of the New York Stock Exchange
- Brevet Brigadier General George Washington Tew – Civil War officer. Lieutenant Colonel of 5th Rhode Island Heavy Artillery. Commander of the Artillery Company of Newport.
- Commodore Benjamin J. Totten – Career U.S. Navy officer
- Charles C. Van Zandt – Governor of Rhode Island 1877–80
- Major General Gouverneur K. Warren – Chief engineer of the Army of the Potomac at the Battle of Gettysburg – Commander of V Corps (1863–65)
- George Peabody Wetmore – Governor of Rhode Island and United States Senator
- Katherine Prescott Wormeley – Literary translator, founder of the United States Sanitary Commission during the Civil War

== Images ==
=== Common Burial Ground ===
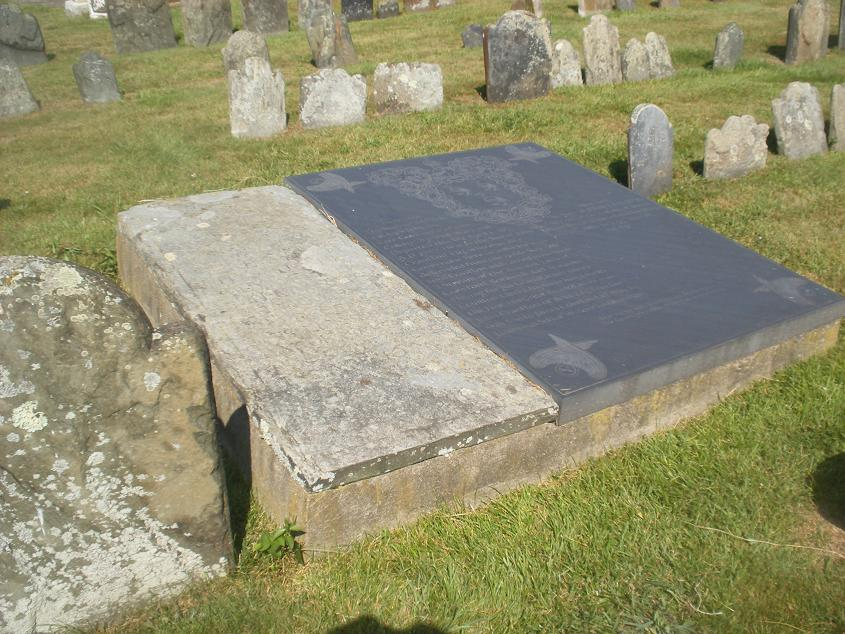
Original grave slab for Governor John Cranston on left, and newer slab for both him and his son, Governor Samuel Cranston, on right

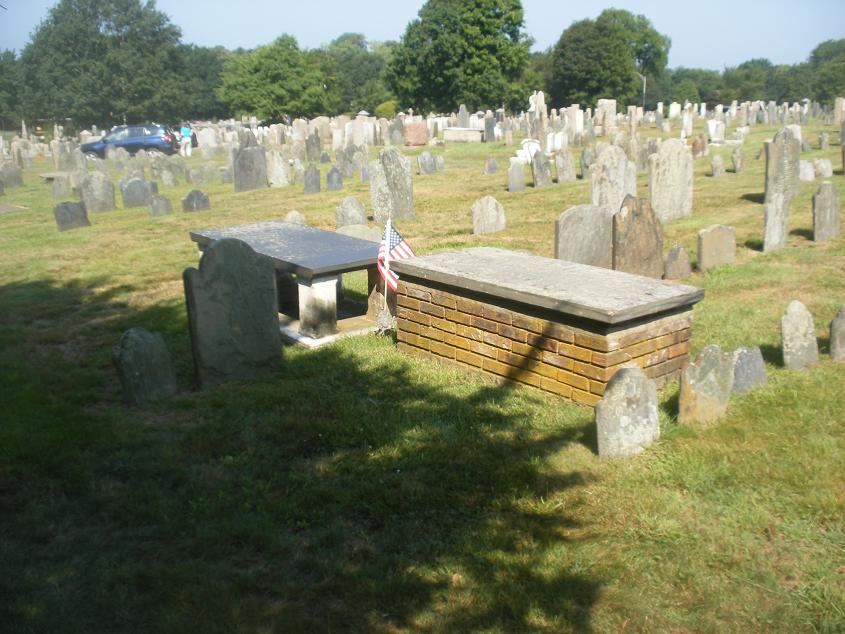
Table marker for Governor Samuel Ward on left; brick vault for his father, Governor Richard Ward, on right

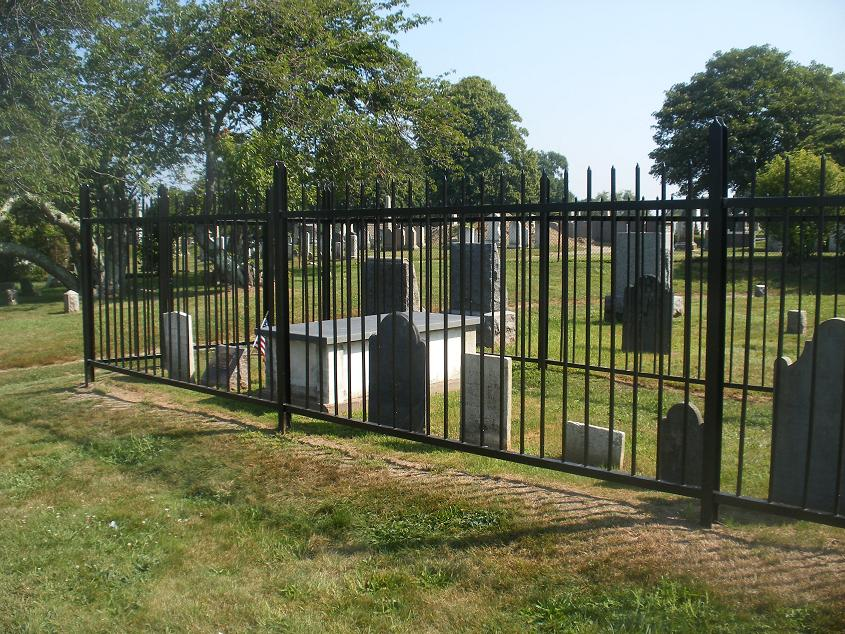
Enclosed plot for Deputy Governor William Ellery, signer of the Declaration of Independence

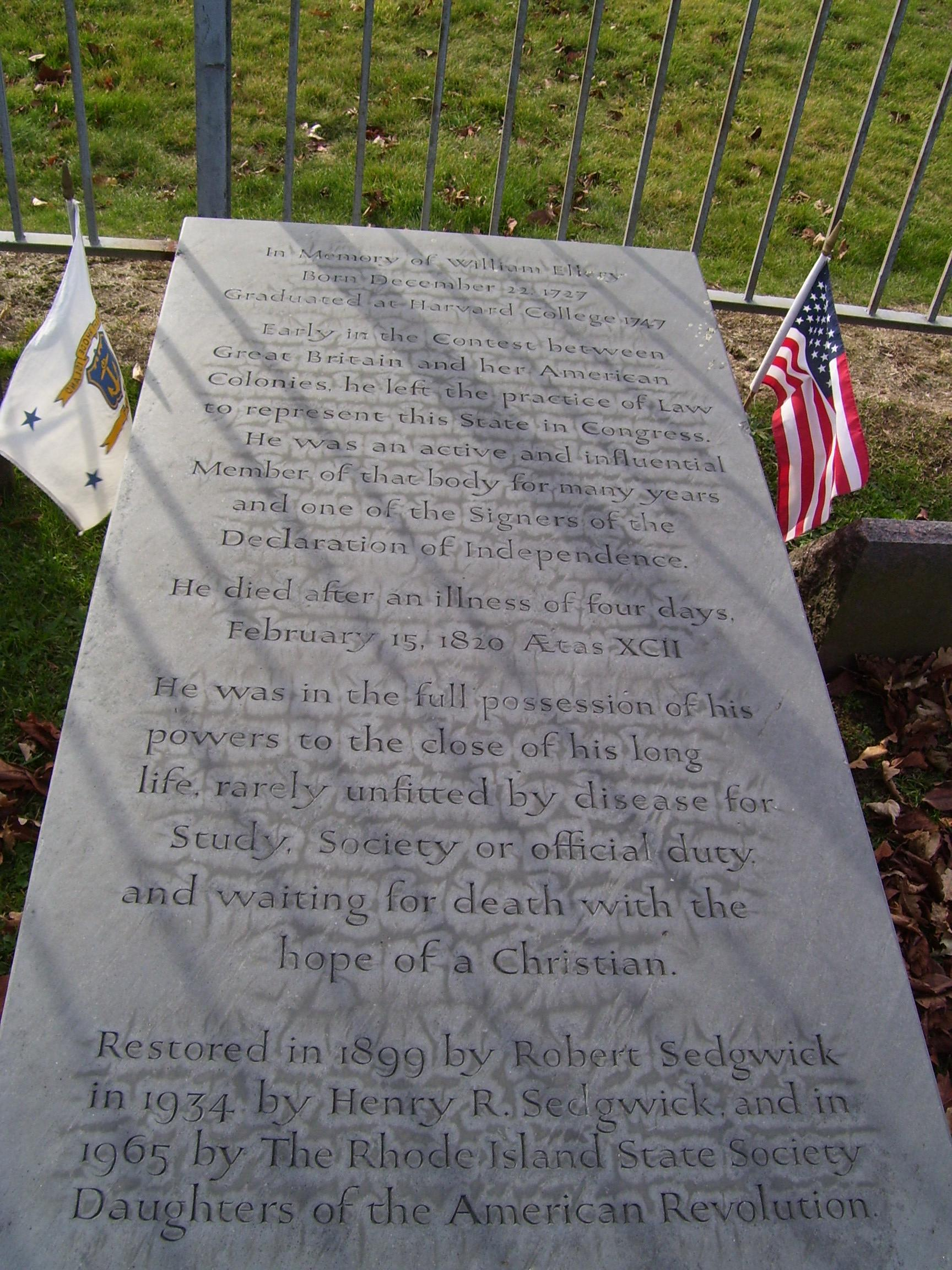
William Ellery grave inscription

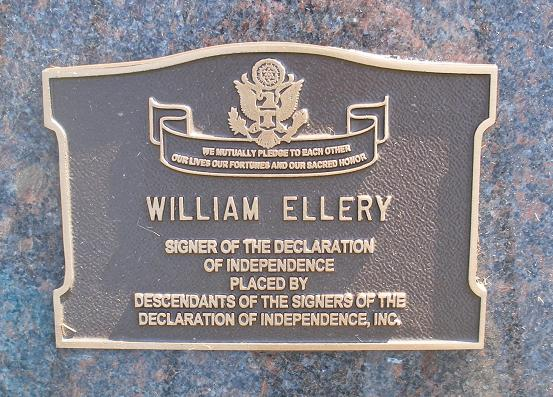
Grave plaque for William Ellery

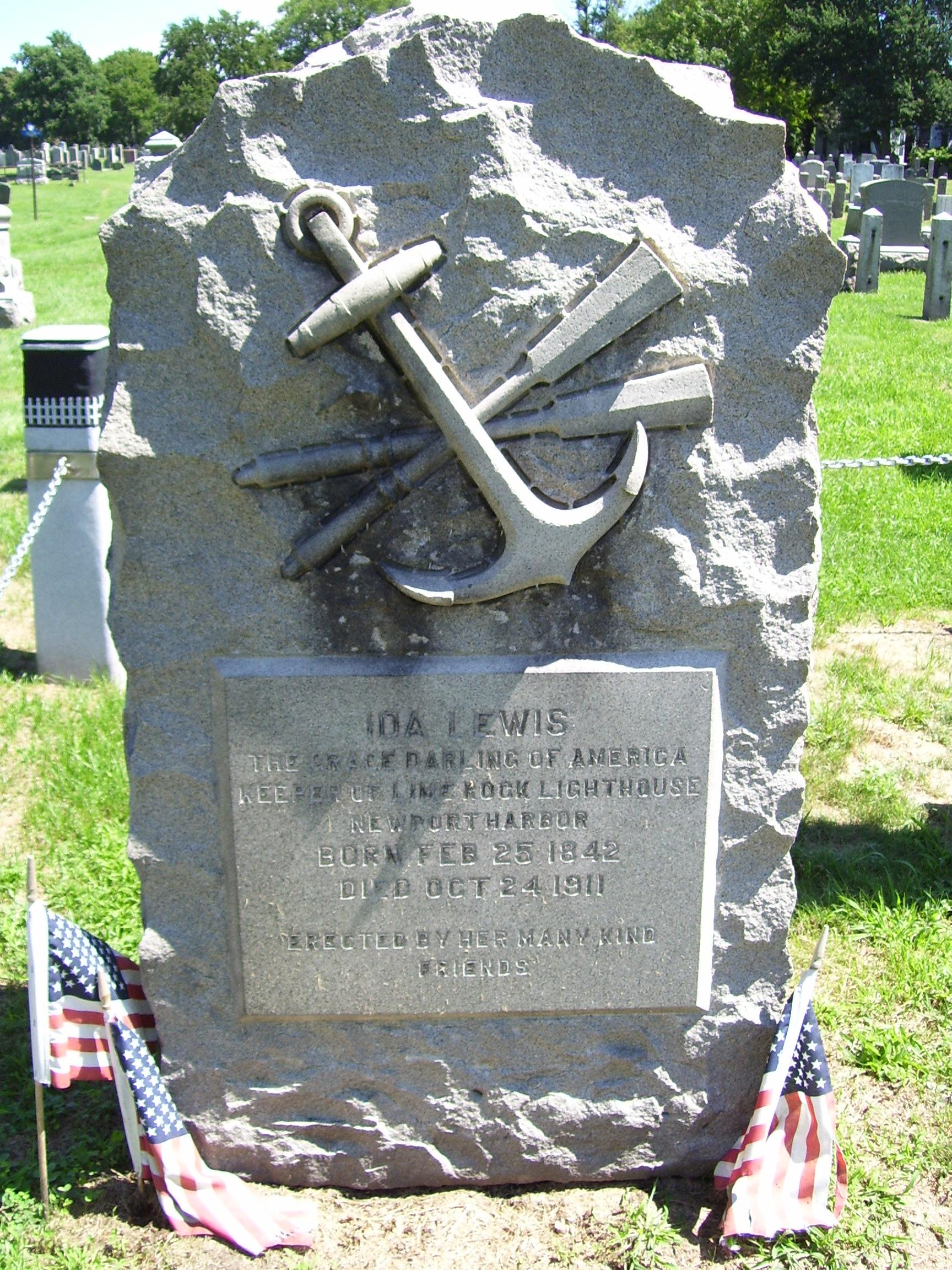
Ida Lewis monument

=== Island Cemetery ===
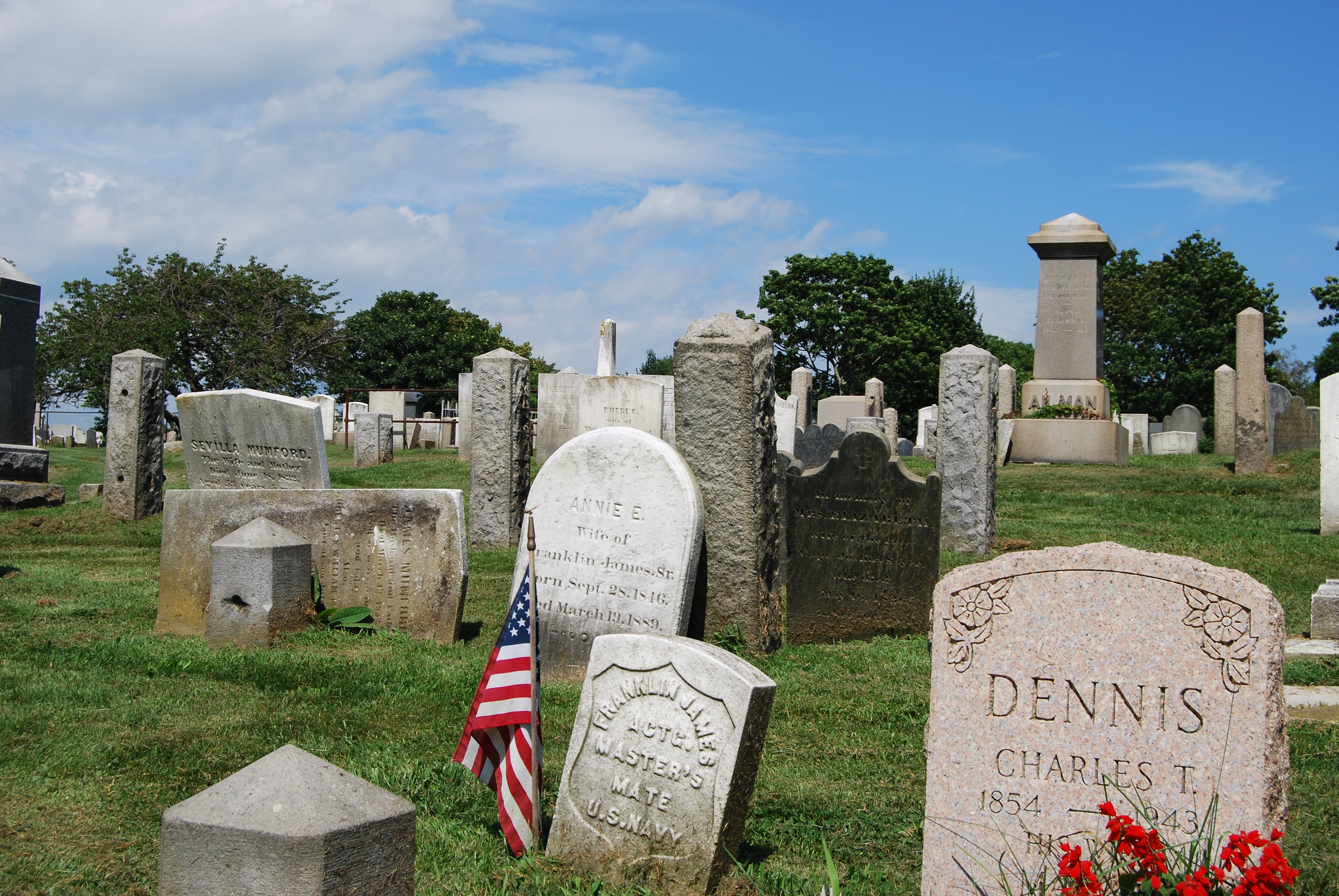
Island Cemetery in 2009

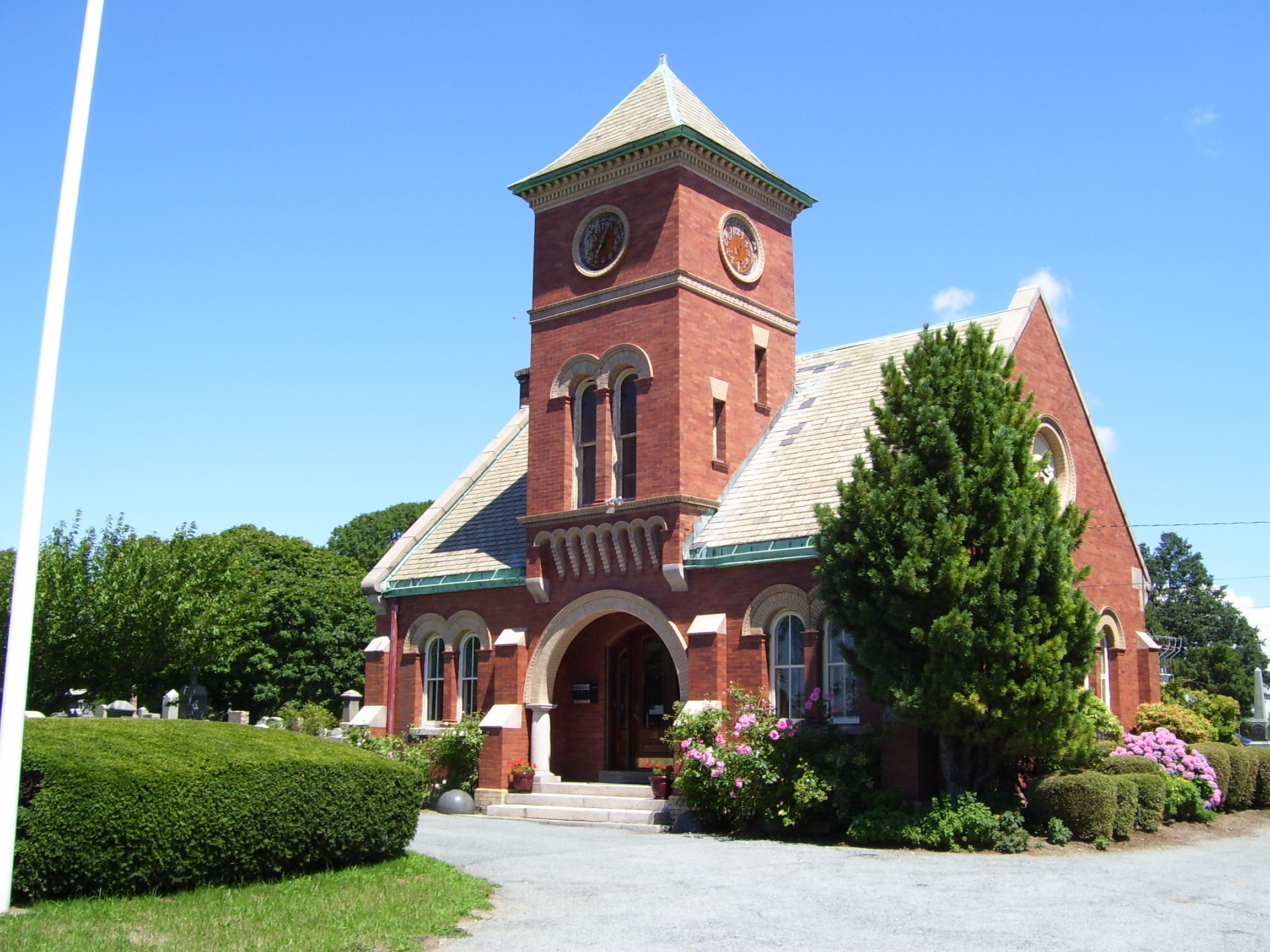
Entrance building

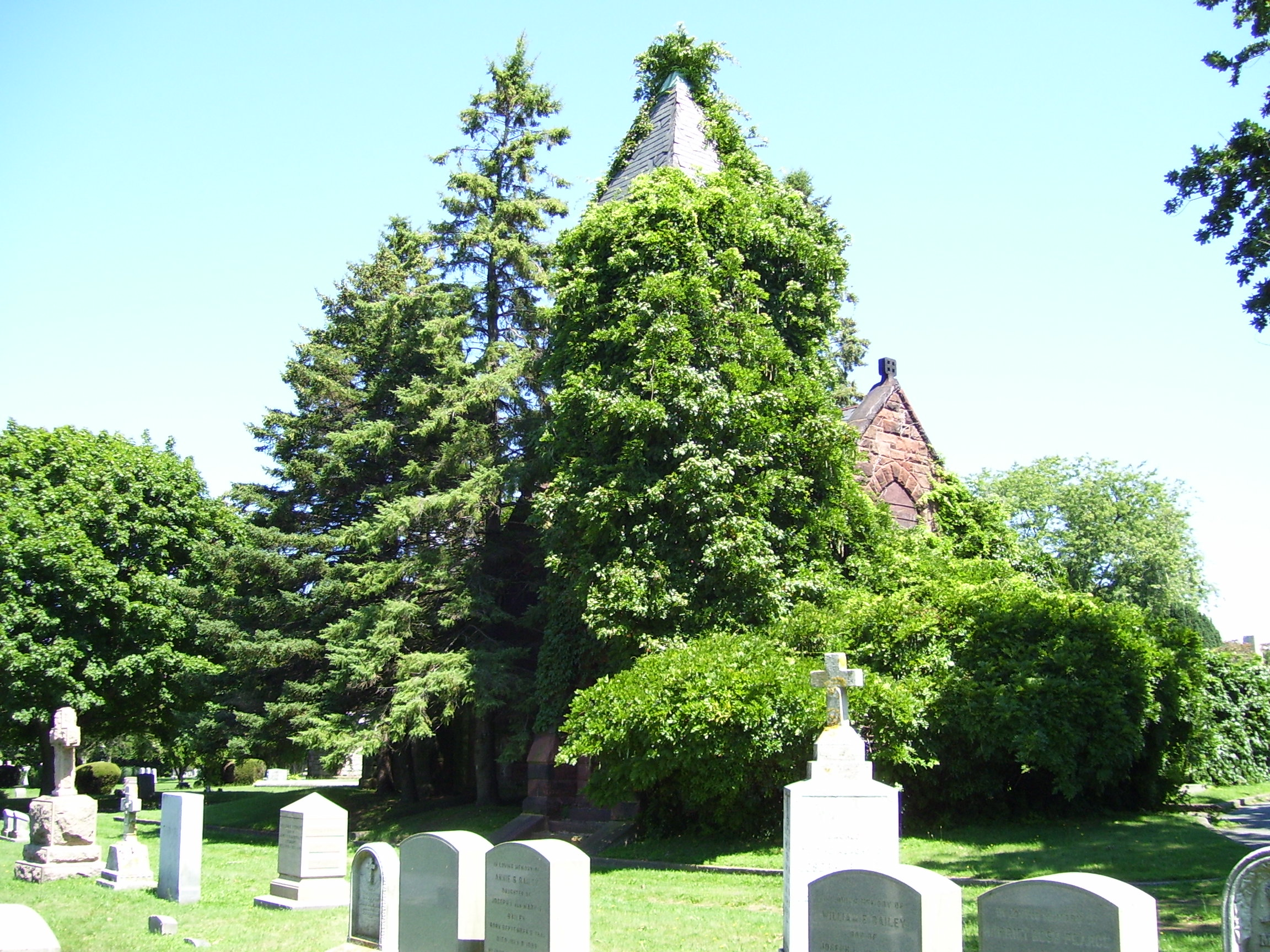
Overgrown cemetery chapel

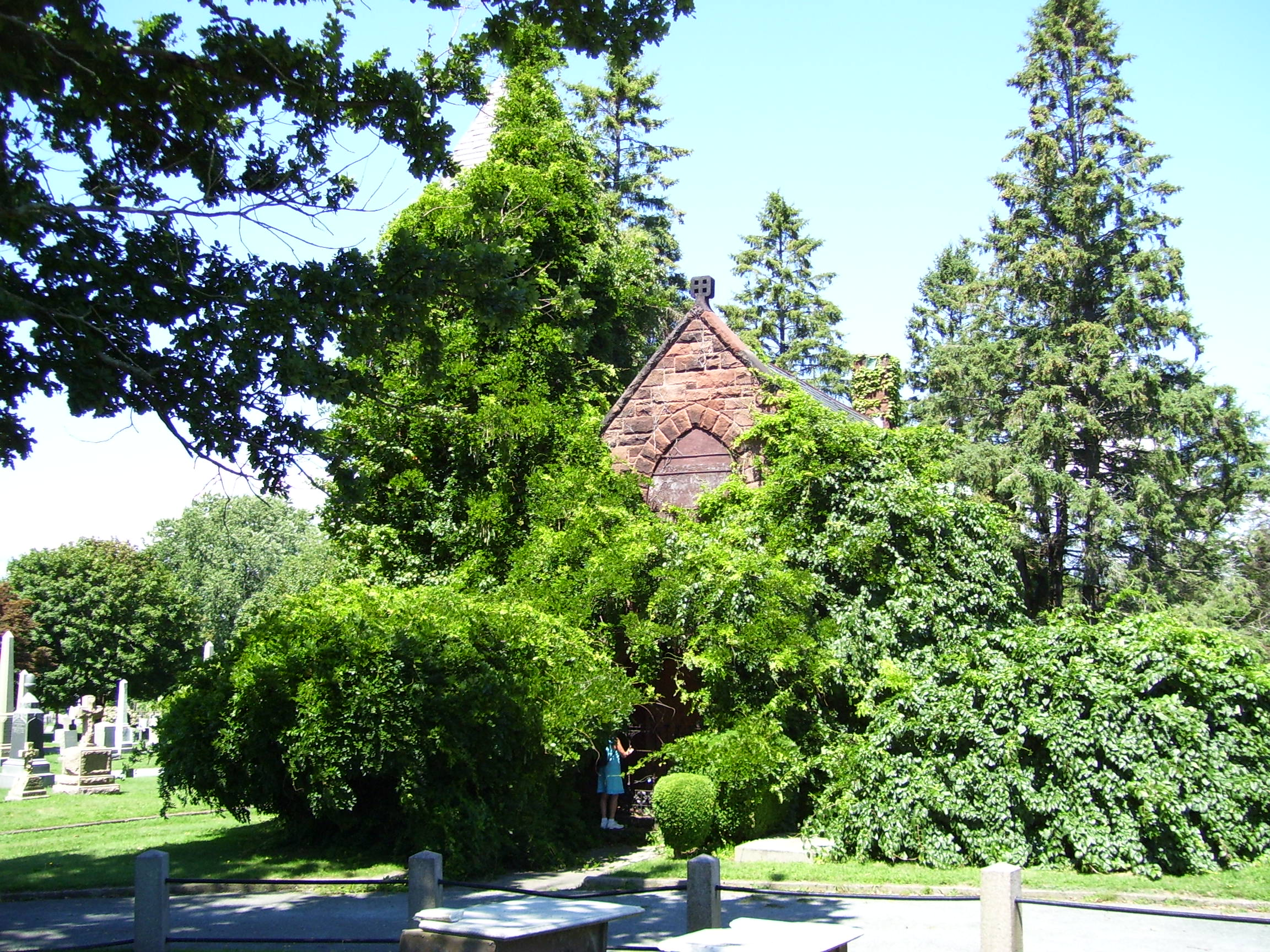
Chapel

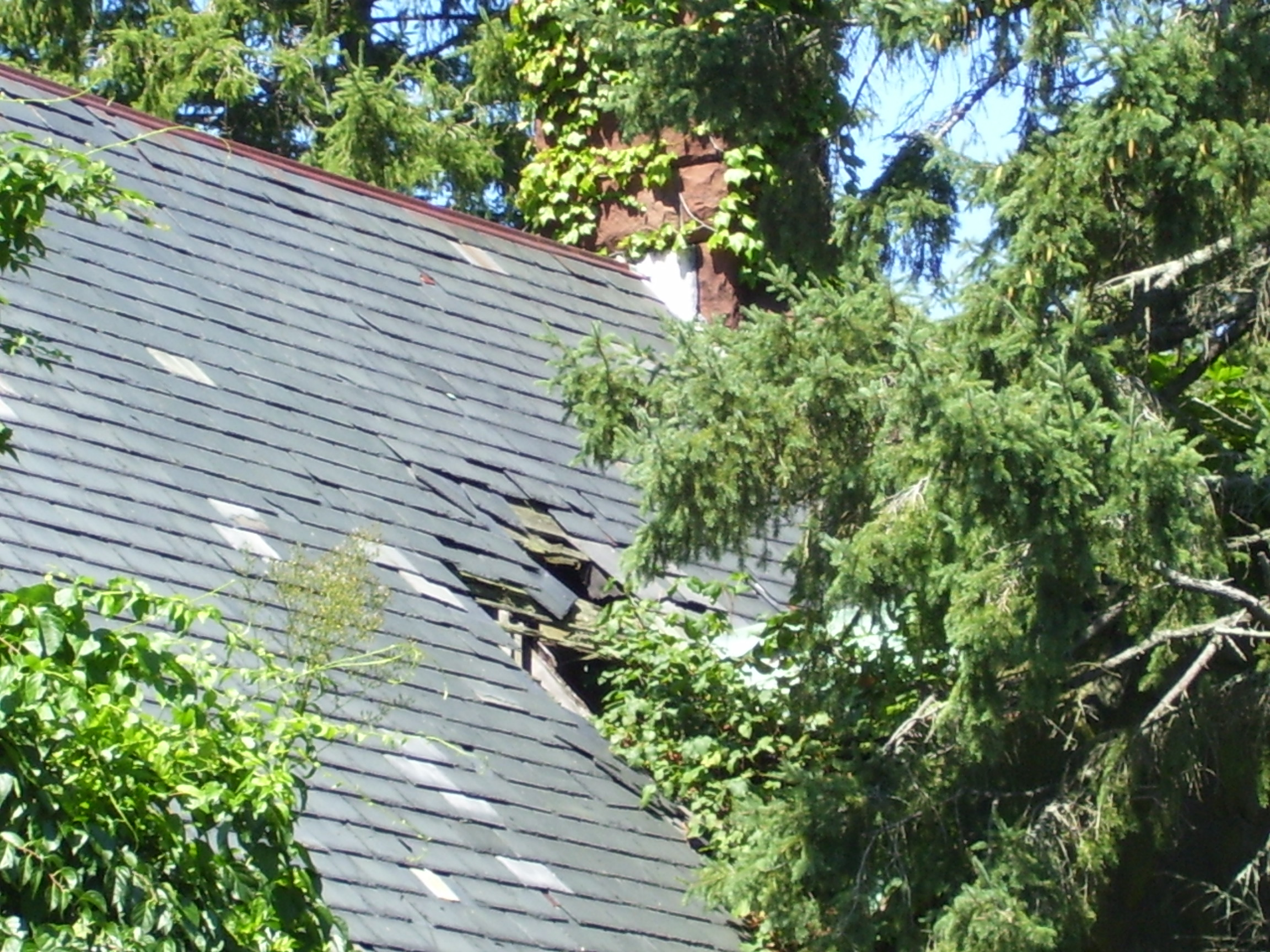
Hole in the Chapel roof

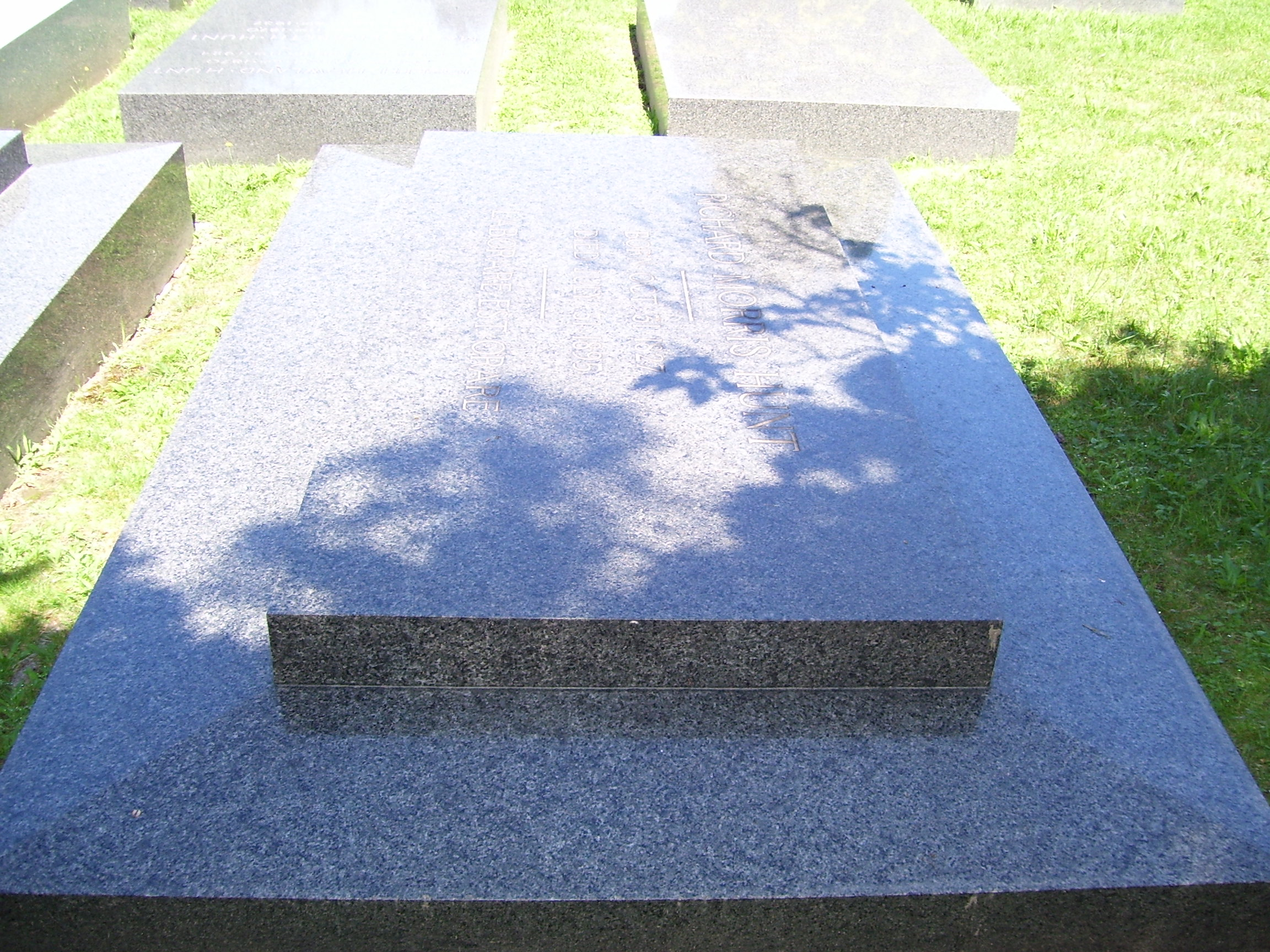
Grave of Richard Morris Hunt

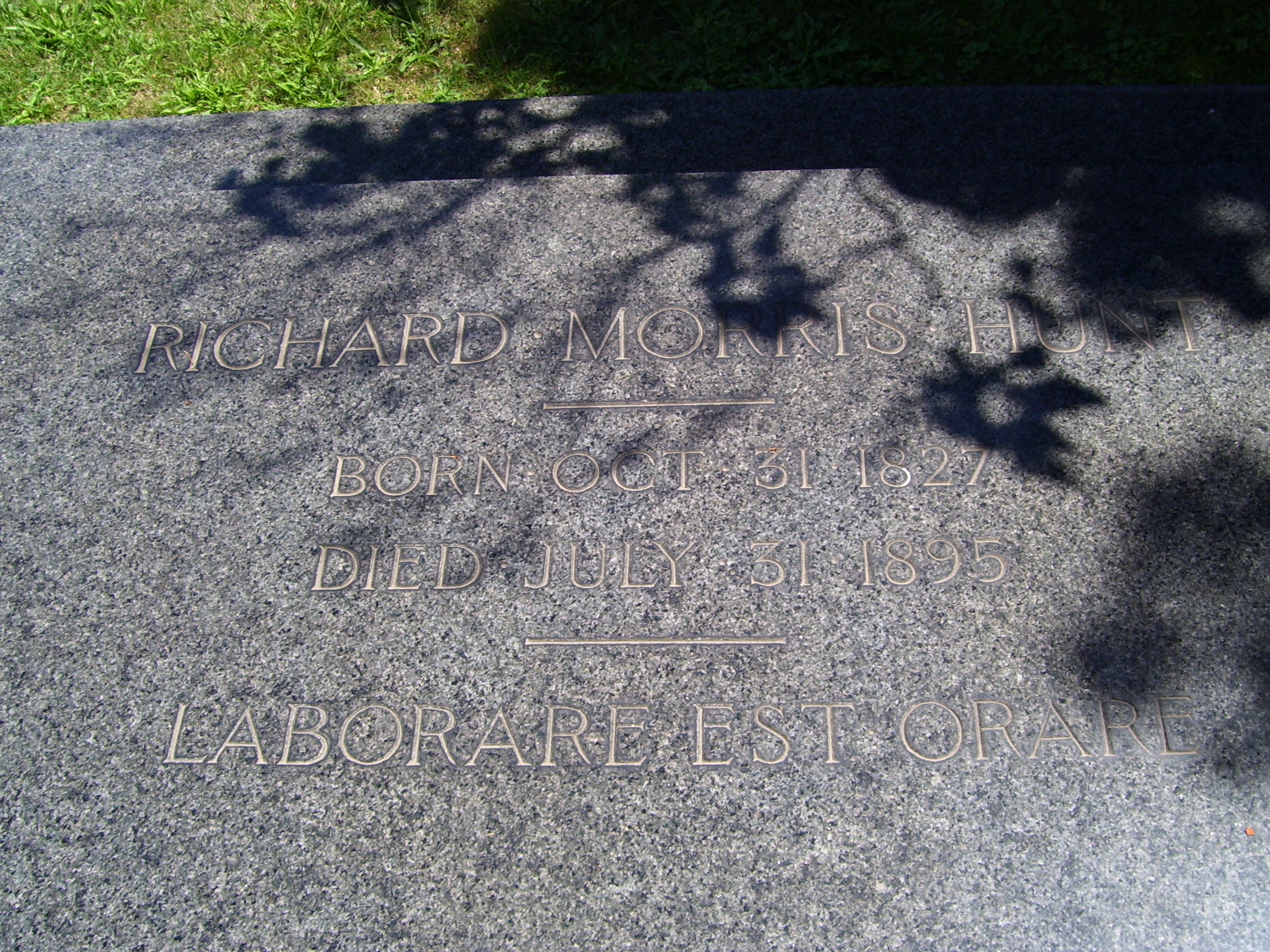
Grave of Richard Morris Hunt

== See also ==
- List of cemeteries in Rhode Island
- Touro Cemetery, the old Jewish cemetery at Newport
- Coddington Cemetery, where six colonial Rhode Island governors are buried
- Clifton Burying Ground, where four colonial Rhode Island governors are buried
- National Register of Historic Places listings in Newport County, Rhode Island
