= Newport Gardner =

- Born: Occramer Marycoo c. 1746; African continent
- Died: 1826; Liberia
- Occupation: Composer

Newport Gardner (born Occramer Marycoo, c. 1746–1826) was an African American singing school master and composer. He was an early proponent of the Back-to-Africa movement.

== Musical career ==
Gardner was transported to the colonies as an enslaved person at the age of fourteen, where he was sold to Caleb Gardner, a young merchant in Newport, Rhode Island. After showing an ability to make music, Gardner's wife arranged for Newport to study with a singing master, most likely Andrew Law. In 1791, Gardner won a lottery in which he secured enough money to buy freedom for himself and his family. Gardner rented the upstairs of a house in Newport, Rhode Island, where he started a singing school. He was also a composer and started writing music at eighteen, possibly becoming published as early as 1803 with the song Crooked Shanks from the collection A Number of Original Airs, Duettos and Trios. He also composed the Promise Anthem. Although the music has been lost, the text is still preserved and is based on passages from the Bible (Jeremiah 30:1-3, 10; Mark 7:27-28).

== Church activities ==
Gardner was also a prominent member of Newport's religious and educational communities. He served as a deacon in the First Congregational Church and as headmaster at a school for black children. Gardner also helped found the Colored Union Church, Newport's first black church, in 1824. The Congregational Church in Boston ordained him as a deacon the following year.

Gardner was also influenced by the writings and preachings of Sarah Osborn who also attended First Congregational Church, as stated in his last letter before his death.

Gardner was also a founder and early member of the Free African Union Society in Newport, the first African benefit society in the United States.

== Return to Africa and death ==
In January 1826 at the age of 80, Gardner sailed from Boston on the brig Vine with 31 fellow Africans to Liberia. The ship made it to Liberia. Still, many in the party, including Gardner, fell ill with fever and died within a year. Gardner was buried, as he had always wished, in Africa.
