= Clarke Street Meeting House =

Historic church in Rhode Island

- U.S. National Register of Historic Places
- U.S. National Historic Landmark District – Contributing property
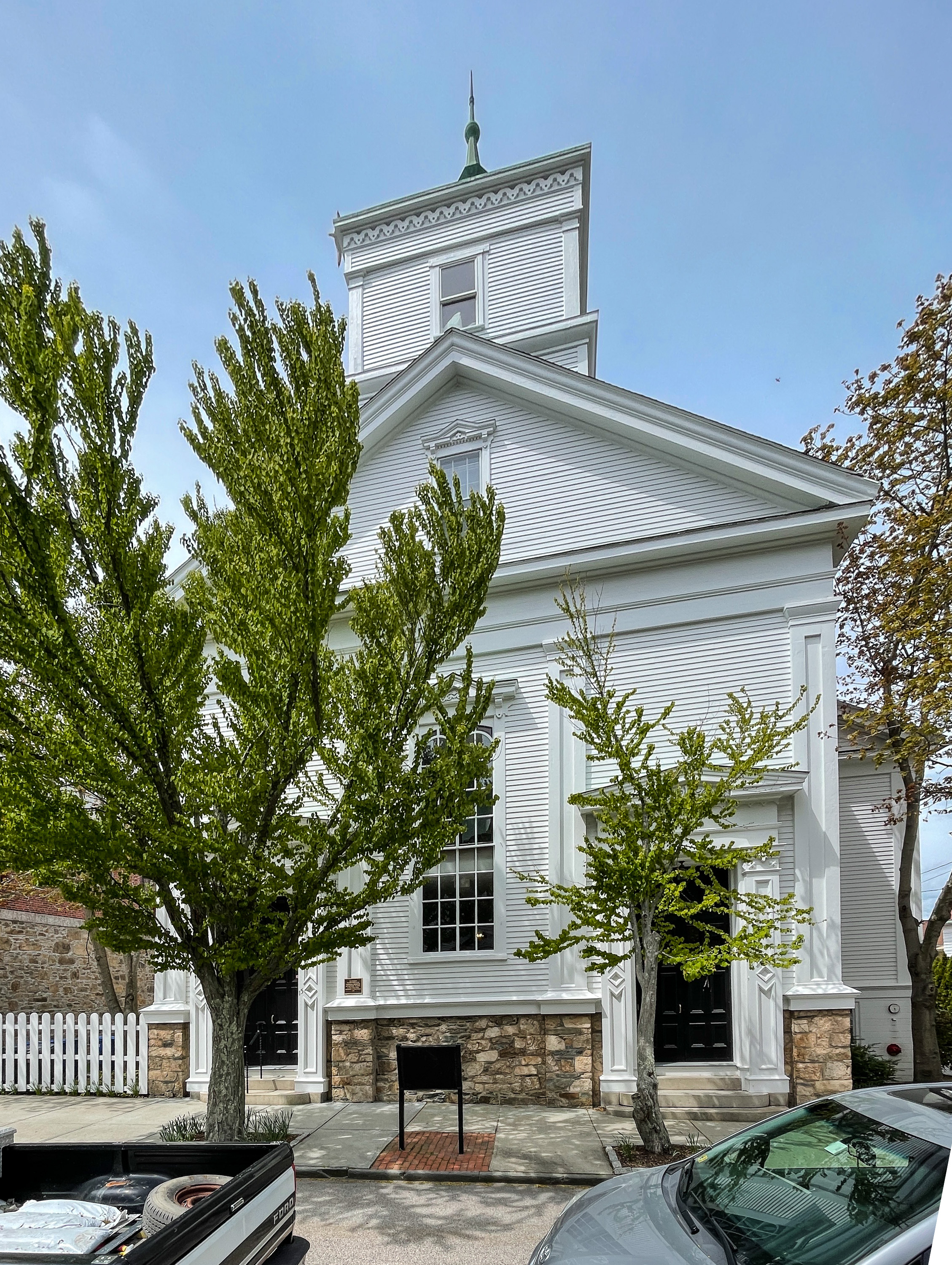

- Location within Rhode Island Location within the United States
- Location: Newport, Rhode Island
- Coordinates: 41°29′22″N 71°18′51″W
- Built: 1735
- Architect: Palmer, Cotton
- Part of: Newport Historic District (ID68000001)
- NRHP reference No.: 71000020

Significant dates
- Added to NRHP: January 25, 1971
- Designated NHLDCP: November 24, 1968

The Clarke Street Meeting House (also known as the Second Congregational Church Newport County, the Ezra Stiles Meeting House or Central Baptist Church) is a historic meeting house and Reformed Christian church building at 13–17 Clarke Street in Newport, Rhode Island, built in 1735. The structure is listed on the National Register of Historic Places.

== History ==
The meeting house was built in 1735 and served as a worship place for the Second Congregational Church, originally a Calvinist congregation. From 1755 to 1786, Ezra Stiles pastored the church and lived in the Ezra Stiles House across the street. He later became the president of Yale College. During the American Revolutionary War, British forces occupied the meeting house and the minister's house for use as a barracks and hospital from 1776 to 1779. After the war, a committee of Second Church members wrote to John Adams in Europe requesting that he contact Reformed congregations there for assistance in repairing the church due to the British army's damage to the building. Adams responded that he would be unable to help because of differences in European attitudes toward soliciting for funds. Regardless of the difficulties, the building was extensively repaired in 1785.

The congregation later left the building and merged with Newport's First Congregational Church to become United Congregational Church to which the building was sold in 1835. In 1847, the Central Baptist Society purchased and extensively modified the building. The church's original steeple blew down in the 1938 hurricane.

In 1950, St. Joseph's Church of Newport purchased the meeting house and further renovated the structure. The Clarke Street Meeting House was added to the National Register of Historic Places in 1971. Around the 1980s, the structure was converted into condominiums.

== Notable congregants ==
- William Vernon, merchant
- Henry Marchant, U.S. District Judge
- William Ellery, signer of Declaration of Independence

== Gallery ==
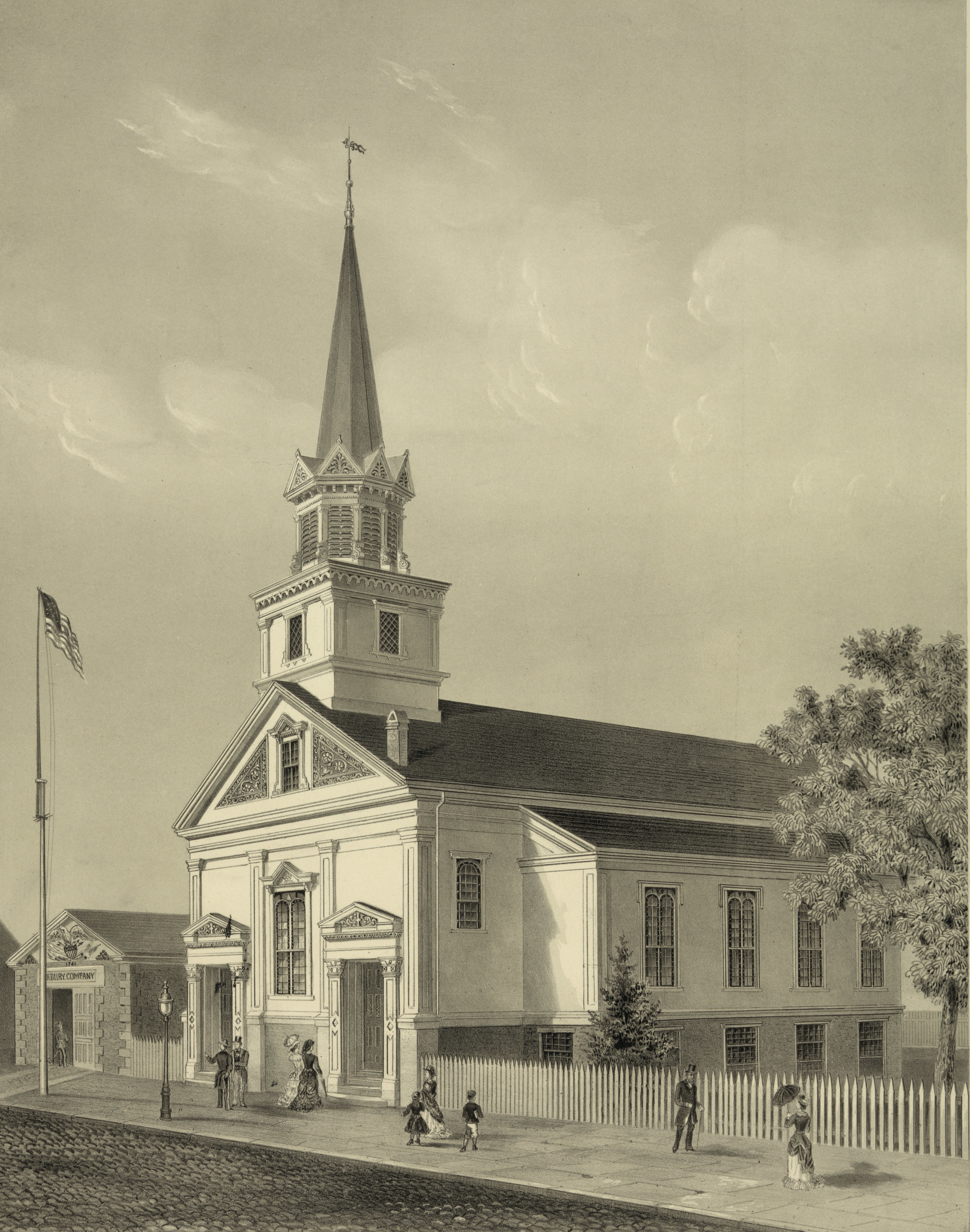
Engraving ca. 1879 showing steeple, which was destroyed in the 1938 hurricane

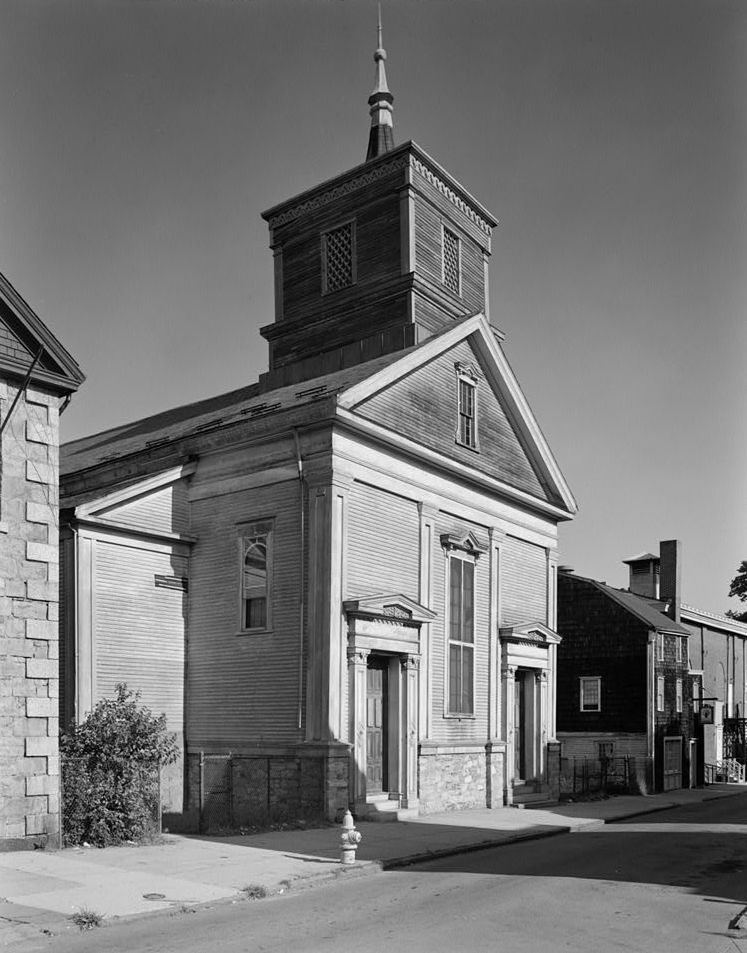
After 1938 hurricane

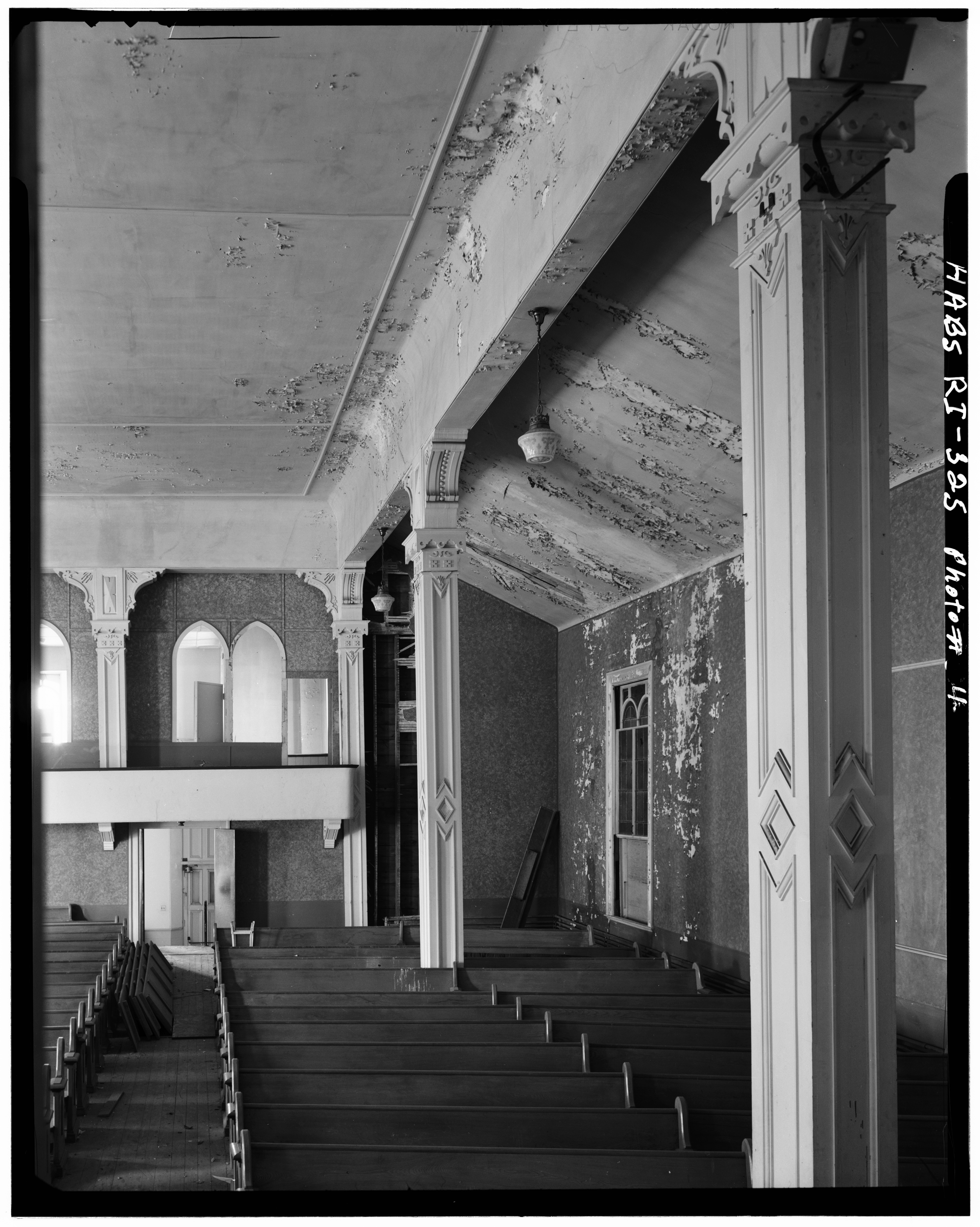
Interior

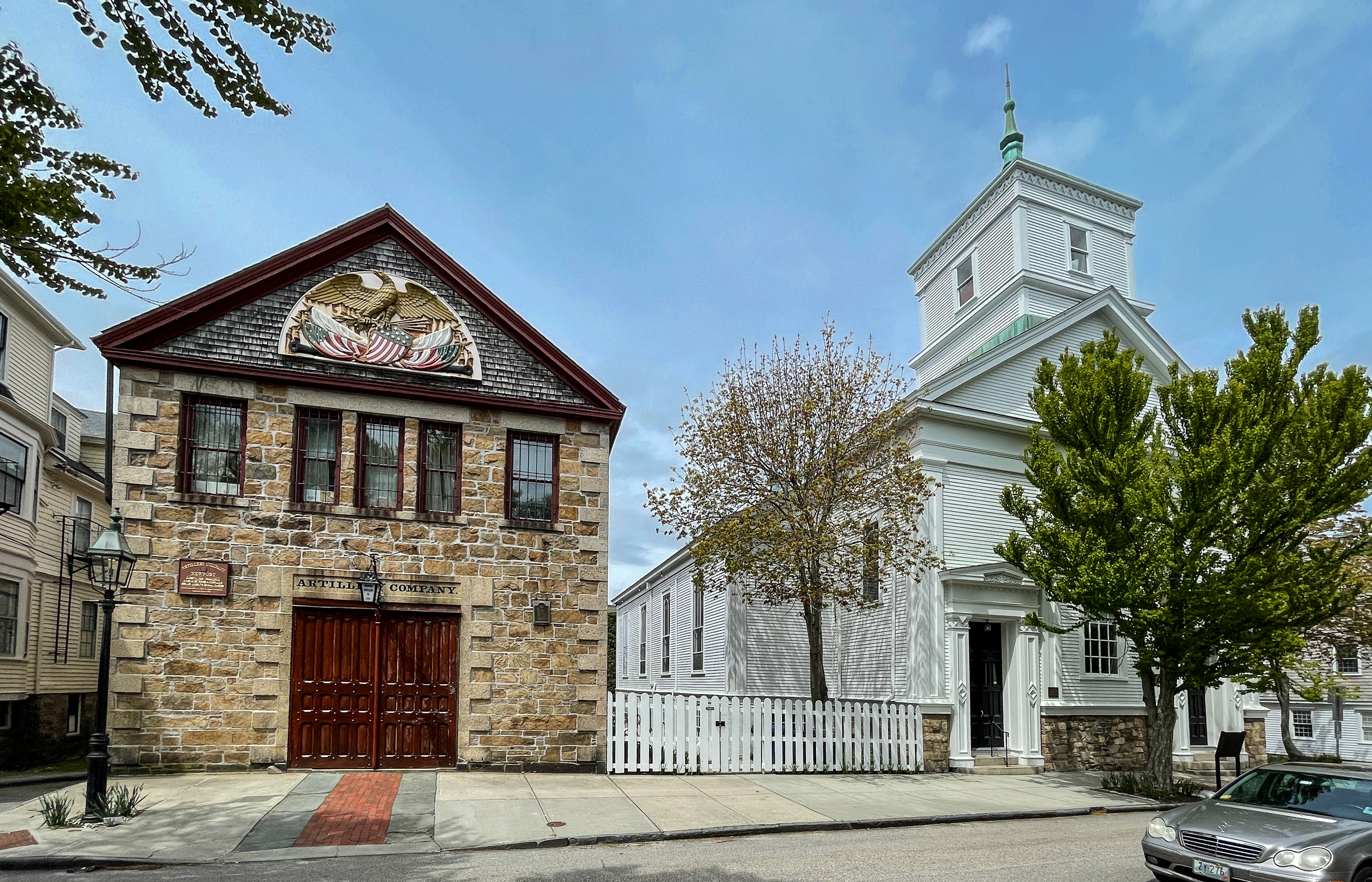
Location on Clarke Street next to the Artillery Company of Newport

== See also ==
- United Congregational Church (Newport, Rhode Island)
- National Register of Historic Places listings in Newport County, Rhode Island
