= John Quamino =

First Black man to attend a college in the United States

- Born: c. 1744
- Died: August 1779 (aged 34–35)
- Other names: Quaum; John Quamine
- Spouse: Duchess Quamino

John Quamino (c. 1744 – August 1779) was a formerly enslaved man who trained as a missionary and may have been the first African to attend college in America.

== Early life ==
Quamino was born to a wealthy family near Anomabu in Ghana, perhaps in 1744 or 1745. In the 1750s, when he was a small child, his father arranged for him to travel and receive a Western education. However, the captain who was meant to transport Quamino instead sold him into slavery. By the 1760s, Quamino was in Newport, Rhode Island, enslaved by Captain Benjamin Church, the father of Dr. Benjamin Church. Quamino's duties in the Church household are unclear. Quamino converted to Christianity shortly after arriving in Newport, where he was a member of the First Congregational Church under Samuel Hopkins.

In 1769, Quamino married Duchess, a chef enslaved by William and Lucy Channing (parents of Unitarian minister William Ellery Channing). During their marriage, they had several children. Charles was born in 1772, Violet in 1776, and Katharine Church in 1779. They also had a daughter named Cynthia. Three of their daughters died young: one at birth, one at age fifteen, and Violet at age 18 in 1792. The couple do not appear to have lived together. Their children lived with Duchess at the Channings' household.

== Freedom ==
In 1773, Quamino and his friend Bristol Yamma won a local lottery. Quamino purchased his freedom with his share of the winnings. It is unclear whether he remained at the Church household, joined his wife at the Channings', or rented a place of his own.

Shortly after buying his freedom, Quamino became a central member of a plan organized by Samuel Hopkins and Ezra Stiles to send Black missionaries to Africa. Although Hopkins and Stiles hoped to eventually send thirty or forty missionaries, the plan began with just Quamino and Yamma as candidates. Both Quamino and Yamma knew African dialects in addition to English, an important asset to make them more effective missionaries than many white academics and divines. Their fundraising letters emphasized the sincerity and strength of their conversions to Christianity. In addition to what were likely sincere religious motivations on Quamino's part, the missionary trip would also enable him to see his mother, with whom he had been able to communicate by letter. The group's fundraising was successful, attracting support from religious figures in America, England, and Africa, including the famous poet Phyllis Wheatley.

In 1774, Quamino and Yamma left Newport for the College of New Jersey, now known as Princeton University. They did not enroll as students or officially graduate, but studied directly with the college President John Witherspoon. They are therefore sometimes described as the first Africans educated at an American college.

The outbreak of the American Revolutionary War in 1775 disrupted their studies, and their missionary plan was abandoned. During the war, Quamino served as a privateer, a potentially lucrative position through which he hoped to buy the freedom of his wife and children. He died in battle in August 1779.

In 2018, Quamino was depicted in a dance and multimedia work by André Daughtry, "Spiritual Secularism."
