= Free African Union Society =

First US African benevolent society

Early Black history in Newport

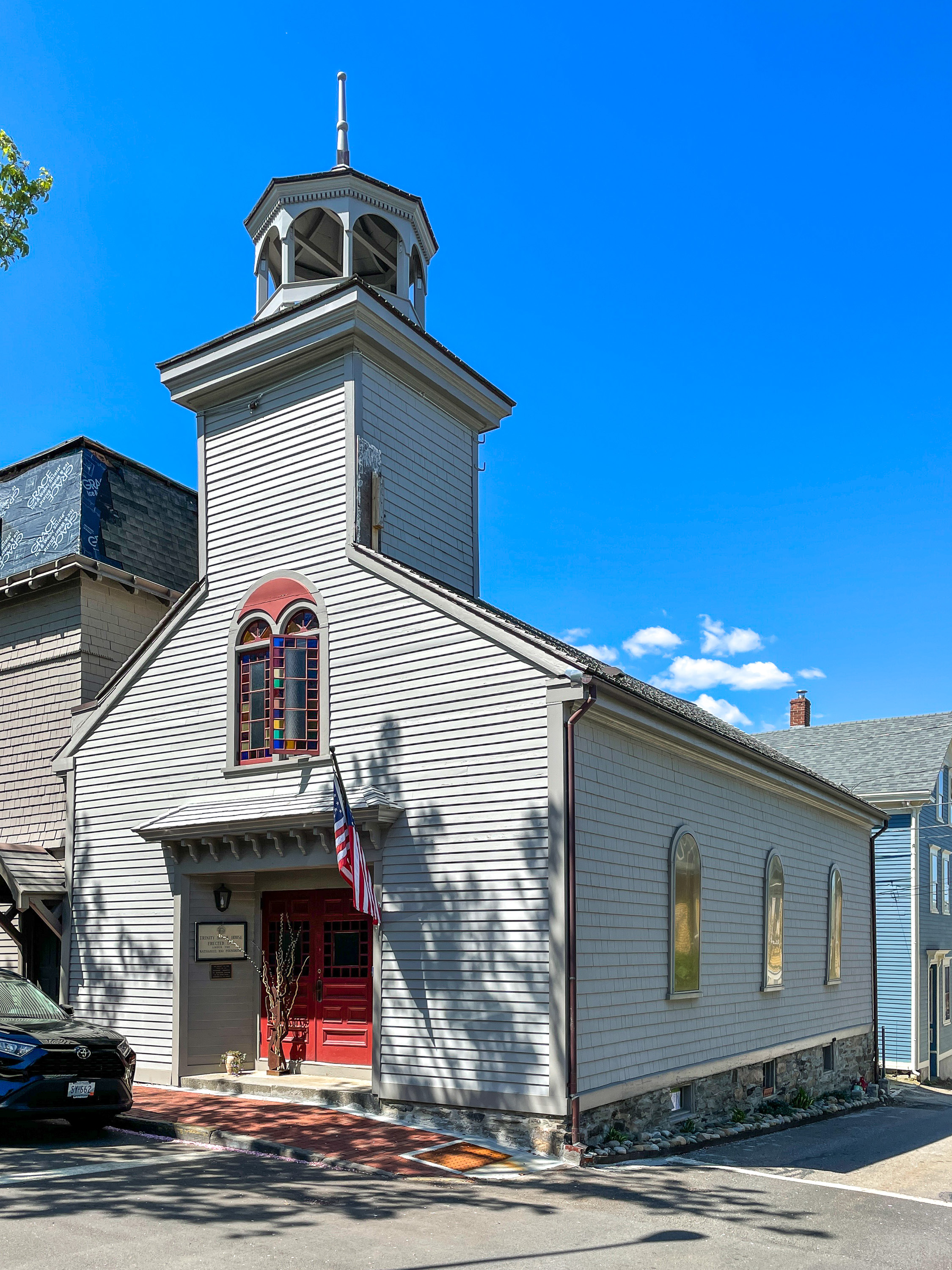
Shiloh Baptist Church, 29 School Street

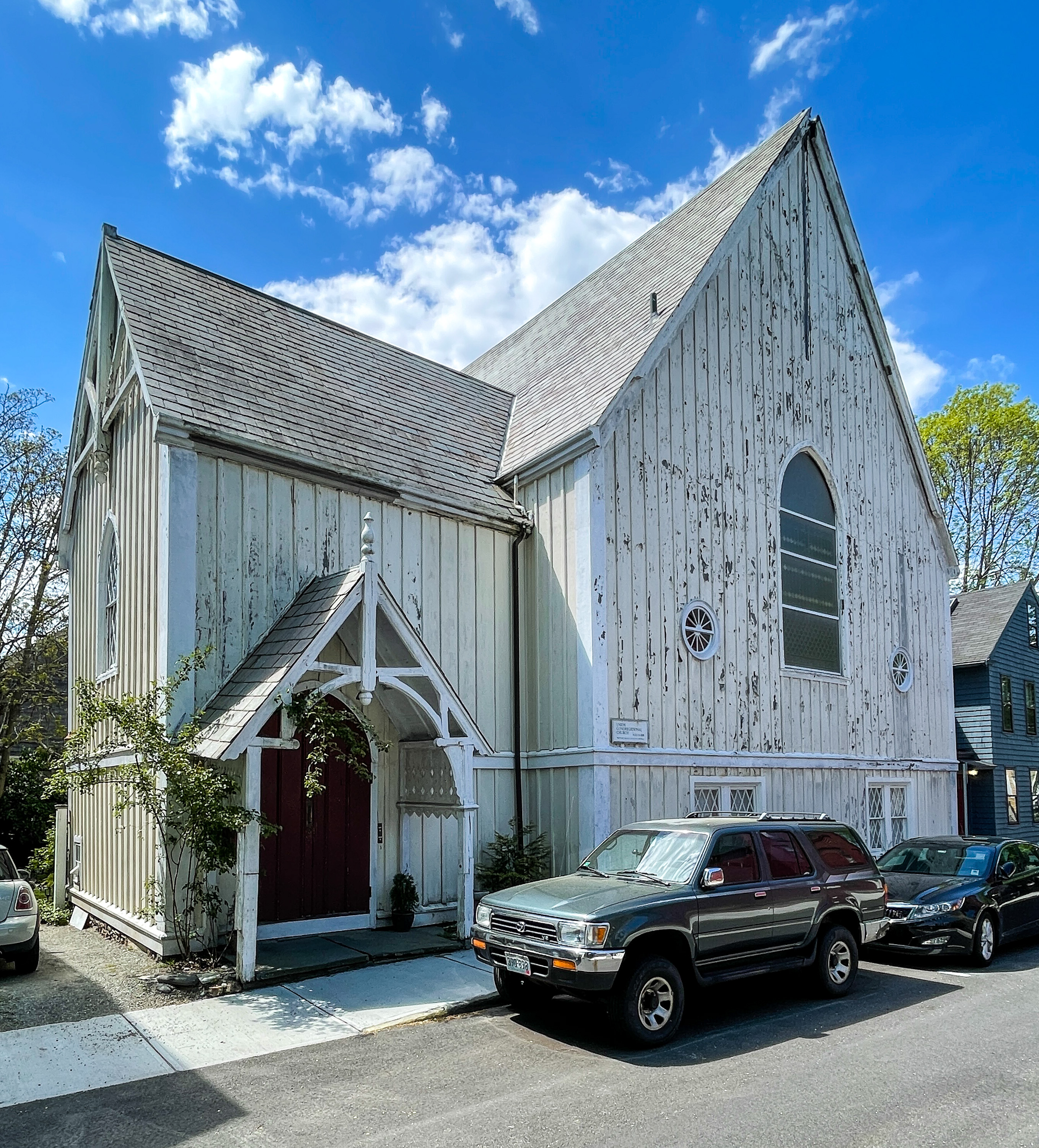
Union Colored Congregational Church, 49 Division Street

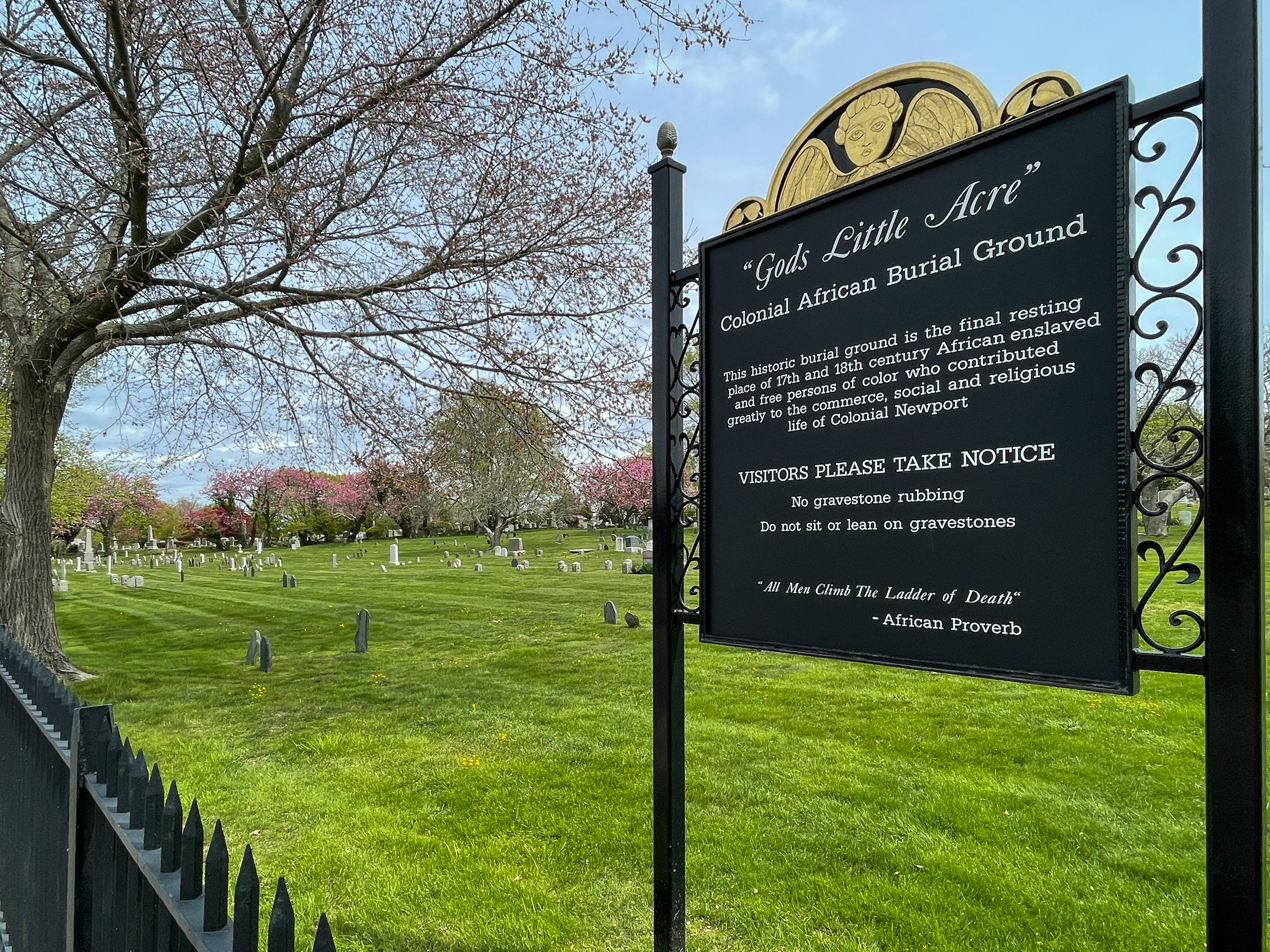
God's Little Acre burying ground

The Free African Union Society, founded in 1780 in Newport, Rhode Island, was America's first benevolent society for African Americans. Founders and early members included Prince Amy, Lincoln Elliot, Bristol Yamma, Zingo Stevens and Newport Gardner.

== Background ==
Although Rhode Island had abolished African slavery in 1652, this law was not enforced; by 1750, Rhode Island had more slaves per capita than any other New England state. Enslaved blacks worked as seamen, farm laborers, and domestic servants. It was not until the Rhode Island General Assembly passed the Gradual Emancipation Act in March 1784 that slavery in Rhode Island was gradually ended. Even after this time, Newport, as a busy port city, remained a center of the U.S. slave trade until at least 1807.

Since most sources of welfare at the time were controlled by whites, free blacks across the early United States created their own mutual aid societies. These societies offered cultural centers, spiritual assistance, and financial resources to their members. Founded in 1780, Newport's Free African Union Society was the first mutual aid society for blacks in the United States, and similar societies formed throughout the Northeast during the next thirty years, including Philadelphia's Free African Society in 1787.

== History ==
Because Newport was a major slave port, the city was home to one of the largest populations of enslaved and free Blacks in the American Colonies.

The Free African Union Society of Newport was established on November 10, 1780, by Newport Gardner (aka Occramer Marycoo), Zingo Stevens and Prince Amy. The purpose was to assist the poor and sick, and to show mainstream white society that blacks could be responsible citizens. They provided members with proper burials, cared for widows and orphans, and promoted the cause of abolition. They also kept basic records of blacks in the community, and hired young enslaved black apprentices in hopes of helping them purchase their freedom.

At least 85 members of the Free African Union Society between 1787 and 1810 have been identified by name. Founding members included Abraham Casey, Salmar Nubia, Quam Bowers, Zingo Stevens, Quash Mowat, Cubber Rodman, Cudjo Hicks, Congo Jenkins, Cuffe Mumford and Arthur Tikey.

In 1824, the society changed its name to Colored Union Church and Society.

== Early Black churches in Newport ==
The center of the African American community in Newport, as elsewhere, was the church. Newport's first African heritage church and congregation was chartered in 1824 as the Union Colored Congregational Church (49 Division Street), followed by Mount Zion AME Church in 1845 (1 Zion Place), Shiloh Baptist in 1869 (29 School Street) and Mount Olivet in 1897 (79 Thames Street).

Newport is home to a large African-American burying ground called "God's Little Acre." It may be home to the largest and oldest surviving collection of burial markers of enslaved and free Africans from the time period.

== See also ==
- Benefit society
- Free African Society, Philadelphia
- Garrison Literary and Benevolent Association, New York
- List of African American newspapers in Rhode Island
