= United Congregational Church (Newport, Rhode Island) =

Historic church in Rhode Island, United States

- U.S. National Register of Historic Places
- U.S. National Historic Landmark
- U.S. National Historic Landmark District – Contributing property
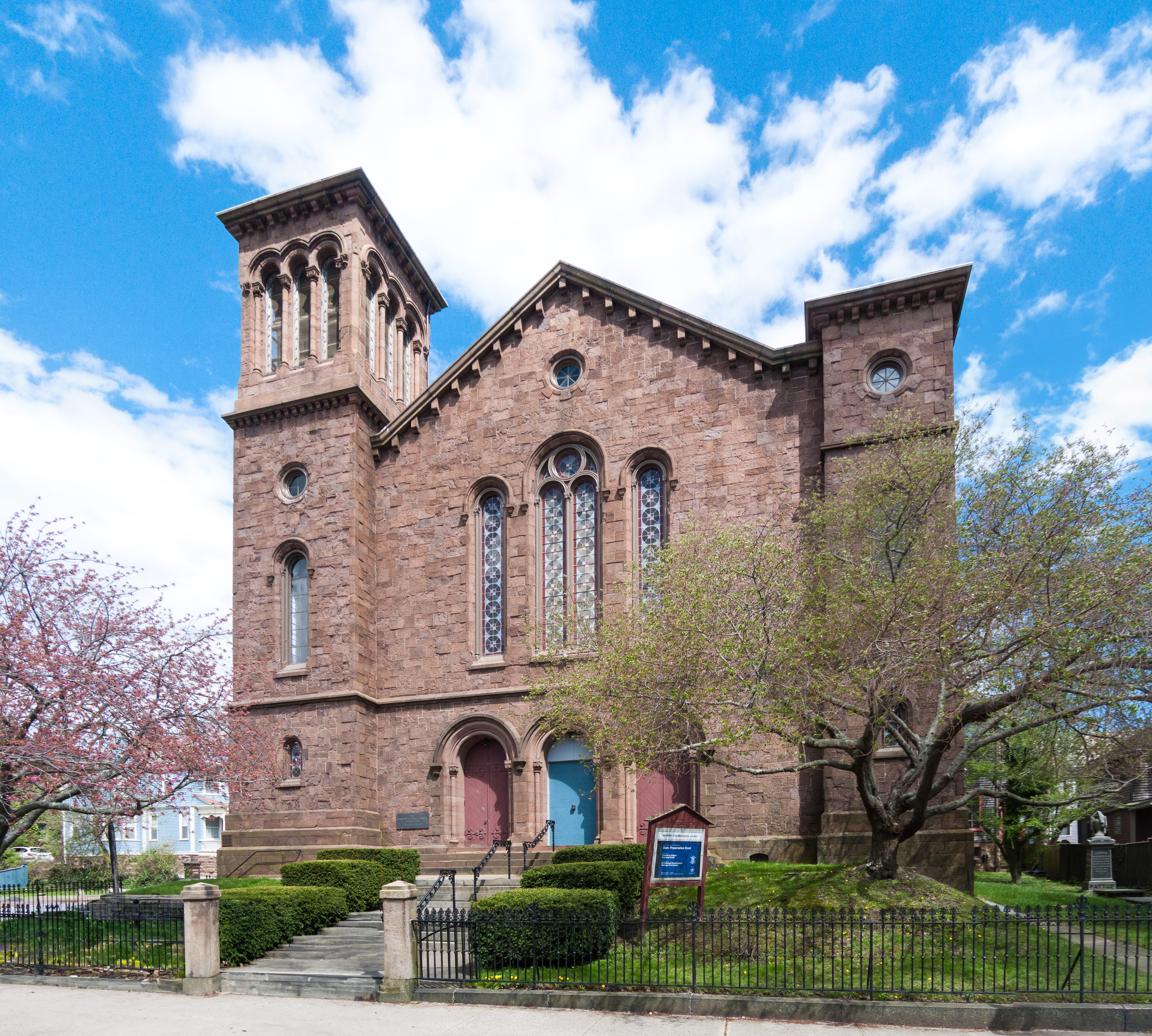
- United Congregational Church in 2017

- Location within Rhode Island Location within the United States
- Location: 73 Pelham Street, Newport, Rhode Island
- Coordinates: 41.4858°N 71.3127°W
- Area: 9 acres (3.6 ha)
- Built: 1857
- Architect: Joseph C. Wells; John LaFarge
- Architectural style: Romanesque, Lombardic
- Part of: Newport Historic District (ID68000001)
- NRHP reference No.: 71000027

Significant dates
- Added to NRHP: November 19, 1971
- Designated NHL: October 16, 2012
- Designated NHLDCP: November 24, 1968

The United Congregational Church (also called First Congregational Church, Second Congregational Church and Newport Congregational Church) is a historic former church building in Newport, Rhode Island. The congregation was formerly affiliated with the United Church of Christ (UCC). Built in 1857, the church was designated a National Historic Landmark in 2012, in recognition for the unique interior decorations executed in 1880–81 by John La Farge.

== History ==
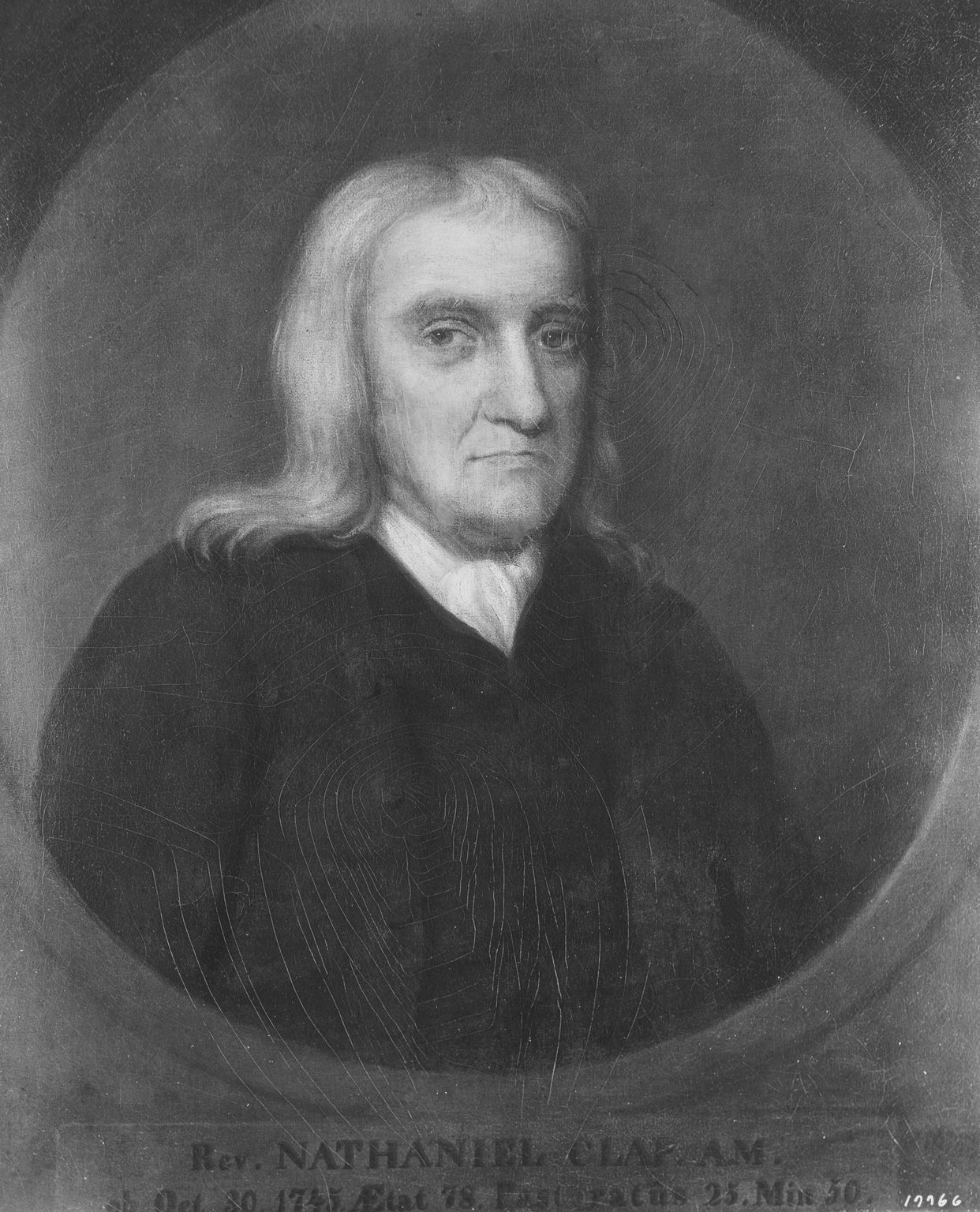
Rev. Nathaniel Clap gathered the First Congregational Church in Newport

The congregation was gathered as Newport's First Congregational Church in 1695 by Rev. Nathaniel Clap, a Harvard College graduate who ministered to the Newport congregation until his death in 1745. The Second Congregational Church of Newport started another congregation in 1735, but the two later reunited. The congregation was active during the American Revolution and both churches' meeting houses were used as barracks and hospitals by the British and French troops in Newport. Dr. Samuel Hopkins was the minister of the church in the late eighteenth century.

As of 2009, the church was pastored by the Reverends Mary Beth Hayes and Nan L. Baker. The church has since closed, and has undergone renovation to become an events center.

== Building ==
The current building is a Romanesque Revival structure, designed by Joseph C. Wells of New York City and completed in 1857. It is a basically rectangular building, built out of Connecticut brownstone, with two ornately decorated towers. In the 1880s the congregation retained the artist John LaFarge to redecorate its interior. LaFarge had recently completed work on Trinity Church, Boston, and sought to provide a more elaborate interior than he was able to in Boston. He produced twenty stained glass windows and a series of murals, which represent the only fully integrated ecclesiastical interior he produced. The church was listed on the National Register of Historic Places in 1971, and designated a National Historic Landmark in 2012.

== See also ==
- Clarke Street Meeting House
- List of National Historic Landmarks in Rhode Island
- National Register of Historic Places listings in Newport County, Rhode Island
