= Black Sea Incident (1838) =

1838 shipwreck and massacre of Russian soldiers by Circassians

- Part of Caucasian War
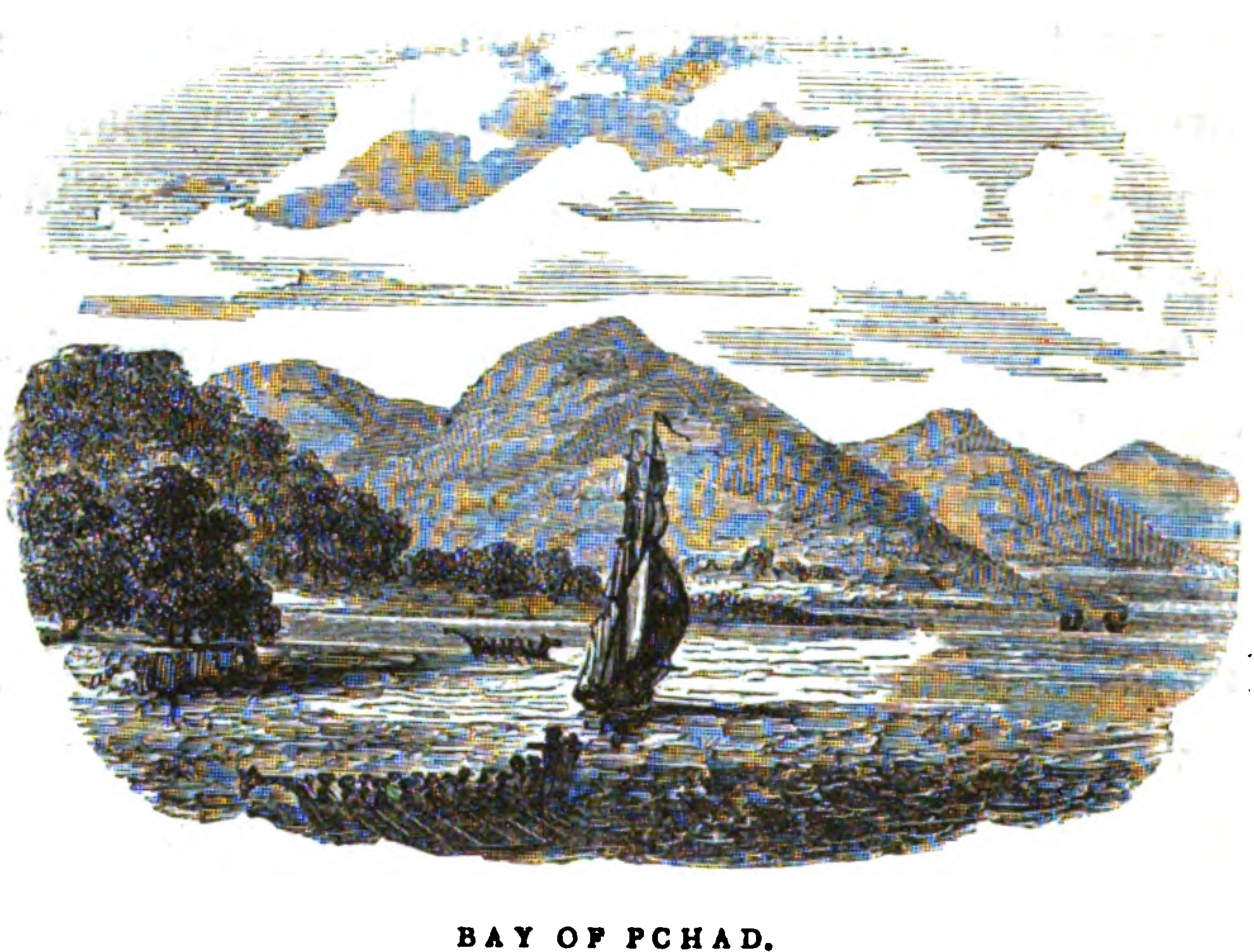
- Location: Black Sea, Circassian coast
- Date: 12 June 1838
- Target: Russian soldiers
- Attack type: Shipwreck
- Deaths: approx. 200 – 1,000
- Perpetrator: Circassians
- Motive: Defense against Russian invasion

The Black Sea Incident or Destruction of Russian soldiers by Circassians was an attack on Russian soldiers who were part of a fleet sent to invade Circassia. The fleet was struck by a storm in the Black Sea on 12 June 1838, resulting in the wrecking of several ships. The surviving soldiers who managed to reach the shore were killed by Circassians defending their land.

== Background ==
In June 1838, a Russian naval fleet, preparing for an expedition against the Circassians, encountered a violent storm in the Black Sea. The fleet consisted of a large frigate with 60 guns, a corvette with 20 guns, a large steamship, and several smaller vessels, including 7 state ships and 24 merchant ships carrying soldiers, ammunition, and supplies. As a result of the storm, several ships were destroyed, with some sinking while others ran aground.

== Massacre ==
The massacre occurred after the storm on 12 June 1838, when a portion of the Russian soldiers who survived the shipwreck managed to reach the shores of Circassia. The Circassians, who were fiercely resisting Russian expansion, attacked the soldiers immediately upon their arrival. All of the soldiers who managed to reach the shore were killed by the Circassians, with estimates of the number of victims reaching approximately 3,000 men.

=== American version ===
In the night from May 30 to 31, 1838, a powerful storm struck the shores of Circassia, causing significant damage to the Russian fleet. The storm sank a large number of both military and merchant ships. According to the American newspaper The Newport Mercury on September 8, 1838.

No fewer than 30 Russian ships were rendered inoperable by the storm. The garrison of the fortress of Sochi conducted two sorties to rescue two military corvettes. However, after being attacked by Circassians, the garrison was forced to retreat, losing 1,000 soldiers out of a force of 1,100."

=== Russian version ===
From November 25 to 27, 1838, a severe storm raged across the Tuapse district and the southern regions of Russia, causing significant destruction. This storm brought to mind a similarly powerful storm that struck the Black Sea coast on May 30 (Old Style), 1838, shortly after the Russian landing force established the Velyaminovsky Fort, which would later become the city of Tuapse. Contemporary accounts indicate that the waves reached a height of 4 fathoms (24 ft; 7.3 m). During the storm, five military ships, eight merchant vessels, and around 70 sailors and officers perished.

In a letter dated June 18, 1838, the Commander-in-Chief of the Black Sea Fleet and Ports of the Black Sea, Military Governor of Sevastopol and Nikolaev, Vice-Admiral M. P. Lazarev, wrote to Admiral A. S. Menshikov, Chief of the Main Naval Staff, describing the event.

The disaster that befell our ships at the Tuapse raid is one of those rare occurrences that almost defy belief. From the impact the storm had on our ships, which were equipped and managed in the best possible way, it is clear that the hurricane raged with extraordinary ferocity, and the enormous swell, reflecting off the shores, boiled like a cauldron. As for the violence of the wind, one can judge by the steamboat Yazon, which drifted with two anchors while its engine, with 120 horsepower, was running at full power! The ships were lost, but the actions and orders of the commanders in the peril they faced deserve particular attention, especially Lieutenant Panfilov, who, during the storm, while sailing with his crew to the shore against a crowd of armed Circassians shooting with rifles, cleared his way with nothing but stones and broken oars. As for the ships, the tender Skory and the transport Langeron were not a great loss to the fleet. However, the loss of so many officers and enlisted men is to be mourned, as well as the loss of the fine steamboat Yazon, the brig Themistocles, and the tender Luch—ships that were of excellent quality and entirely new. As for naval affairs, I had no doubt that such officers as Khomutov, Metlin, Panfilov, and others would make every possible effort and take all reasonable measures to preserve the entrusted ships, which they did. But there are circumstances against which no skill or human strength can prevail. Unfortunately, this is what happened with the shipwrecks in Tuapse.
