= Henchman (disambiguation) =

A henchman is a loyal employee, supporter, or aide to some powerful figure engaged in nefarious or criminal enterprises.

Henchman may also refer to:

== Media ==
- "Henchman", an episode of the TV series Adventure Time
- "Henchman Theme", a track by Sundar C. Babu from the soundtrack of the 2006 Indian film Chithiram Pesuthadi
- Henchman Number 24, a character in Season 1 of The Venture Bros
- Henchmen (film), a 2018 Canadian animated film

== People ==
- Daniel Henchman (1730–1755), American silversmith
- Hubert Henchman (1876–1963), Australian barrister and public servant, Solicitor-General of Queensland from 1937 to 1945
- Humphrey Henchman (1592–1675), Church of England clergyman, bishop of London from 1663 to 1675
- Jimmy Henchman (born James Rosemond in 1965), American former entertainment record executive and convicted criminal
- Joe Bishop-Henchman, 2020 Libertarian National Committee chair
- Thomas Henchman (1642–1674), Church of England priest, Archdeacon of Wilts from 1663
