= Jacob Hurd =

American silversmith (1703–1758)

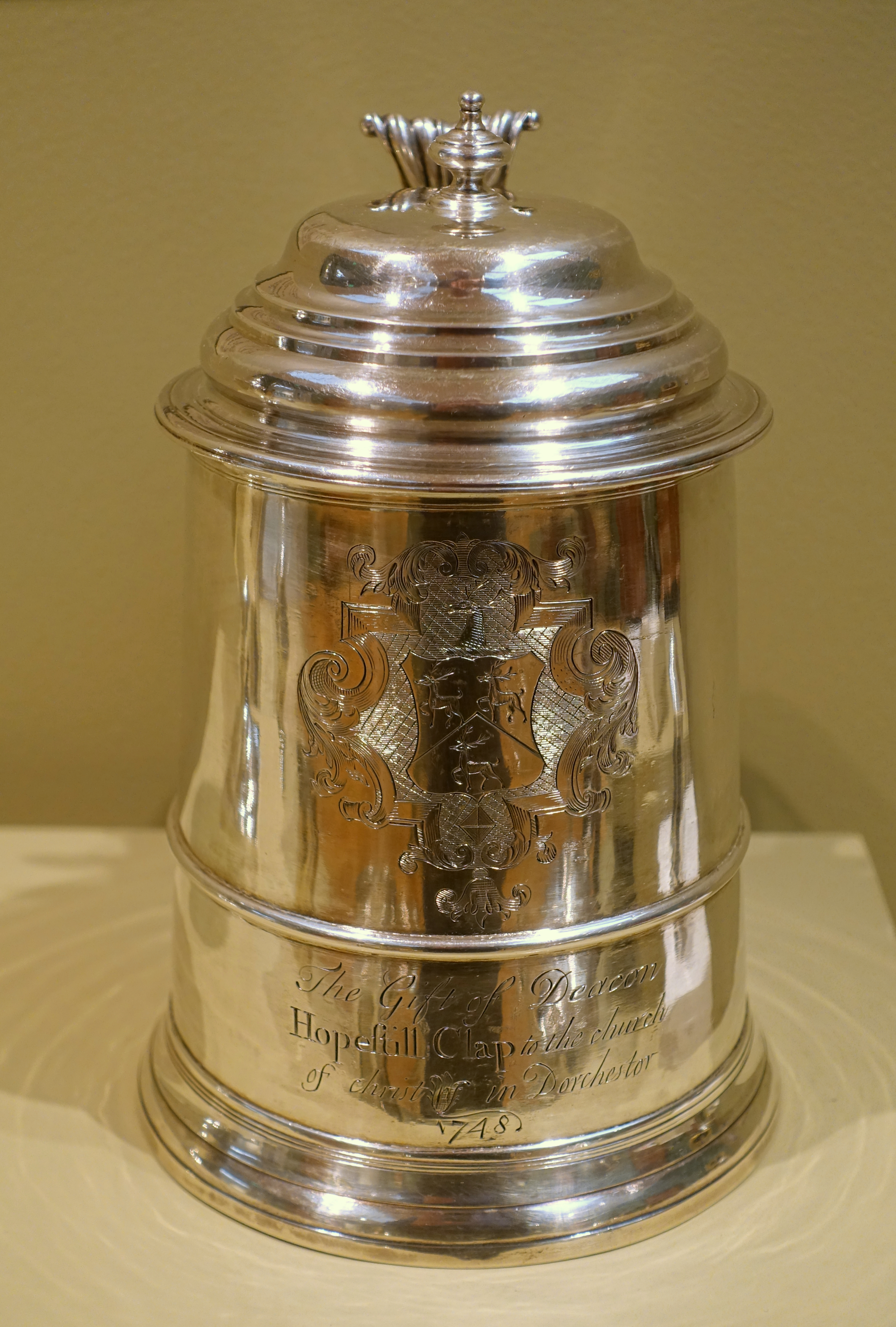
Deacon Hopestill Clap Tankard by Jacob Hurd, c. 1748

Jacob Hurd (February 12, 1703 – February 17, 1758) was a leading silversmith from the Thirteen Colonies, active in Boston, and father to silversmiths Nathaniel Hurd (1729-1777) and Benjamin Hurd (1739-1781), as well as grandfather to Benjamin Hurd Jr. (1778-1818).

Hurd was born in Charlestown, Massachusetts, to Jacob and Elizabeth Tufts Hurd, and there christened on March 27, 1703. He apprenticed circa 1720 to John Edwards, and married Elizabeth Mason on May 20, 1725 in Boston, with whom he had fourteen children. From 1723 to 1755 he worked as a silversmith with his shop located in Pudding Lane, near the Town House, and from 1755 to 1758 in Roxbury. During these years he was master to Isaac Perkins circa 1724, Houghton Perkins circa 1749, Daniel Henchman 1753, and Benjamin Hurd circa 1754.

According to colonial silver expert Patricia Kane, "Jacob Hurd was the most talented and prolific of all Boston silversmiths who made silver objects in the late baroque style. He made more than 50 percent of the surviving silver produced by Boston silversmiths of his generation." Some of his engraving has been described as almost without parallel in Boston silver. He was the favored artisan among Boston's merchant and political families and created many of the most important commissions for public presentations. All told he created over 500 objects.

Hurd was also active in the Massachusetts militia, serving in 1745 as First Sargent of the Artillery Company and later as Captain of a Boston company.

Hurd died bankrupt in Roxbury, Boston. The Boston Gazette, February 20, 1758, reported that "Last Wednesday in the Afternoon Capt Jacob Hurd . . . a noted Goldsmith, was seized with a Lethargy, in which he continued till Friday Evening, and then expired, much lamented." His obituary in the Boston News-Letter, February 23, 1758, recorded that "Jacob Hurd, Capt., goldsmith, formerly of Boston and late of Roxbury being in Town at a Relation's House was seiz'd with an apoplexy, in which he continued speechless till Friday Evening when he departed this Life Feb. 17, 1758."

His work is collected in the Addison Gallery of American Art, Concord Museum, Currier Museum of Art, Fogg Art Museum, Hood Museum of Art, Israel Museum, Jerusalem, Metropolitan Museum of Art, Museum of Fine Arts, Boston, Old State House Museum, Peabody Essex Museum, Walters Museum, Winterthur Museum, Garden and Library, and Yale University.
