= Solomon Southwick (American Revolution) =

American politician

- Born: January 1, 1731 (estimated); Newport, Rhode Island
- Died: December 23, 1797 (aged 66); Newport, Rhode Island
- Resting place: Newport Common Burying Ground
- Occupations: Printer; Newspaper publisher and editor
- Known for: Advocate for Patriot cause during American Revolution
- Spouse: Ann Gardner Carpenter

Solomon Southwick (1731 – December 23, 1797) was a Newport, Rhode Island printer and newspaper publisher. He was a prominent Patriot during the American Revolution, and printed some of the first copies of the Declaration of Independence after its adoption in 1776.

== Early life ==
Solomon Southwick was born in Newport in 1731. At an early age he attracted the attention of Henry Collins, a wealthy merchant and philanthropist, who decided to fund Southwick's college education. Southwick entered the College of Philadelphia (now the University of Pennsylvania) in 1754, as a member of its first graduating class, the Class of 1757.

He left the college before its first commencement, but received an honorary Bachelor of Arts degree based on his accomplishments in Mathematics and other technical subjects.

Southwick returned to Rhode Island and taught school for several years before beginning a career as a merchant.

== Career ==
In 1764 Southwick purchased the Newport Mercury from Samuel Hall, the heirs of James Franklin and Ann Smith Franklin, and became the paper's editor and publisher. He also operated the Mercury's associated printing business, and was one of the first book publishers in the North American colonies. He served as a member of the Rhode Island General Assembly in 1776.

Southwick became involved with the independence movement in the 1770s and was the official printer of the Rhode Island General Assembly. Providing an early and well known rallying cry for the movement, Southwick used the Mercury to announce "Undaunted by tyrants, we'll die or be free!"

When the Declaration of Independence was signed in 1776 Southwick produced printed copies for the Governor of Rhode Island, as well as copies for sale to the public. His first edition was supposed to be dated July 13, 1776, but was mistakenly dated June 13, which was corrected in subsequent versions.

When the British occupied Newport in 1776, Southwick was a prime target for capture, owing to his high profile activism against the British government. He quickly suspended publication of the Mercury and fled with his family, remaining in Providence, Rhode Island and Rehoboth, Massachusetts until it was safe to return home. In 1778 he was appointed Deputy Commissary General, responsible for obtaining and distributing food, clothing and other supplies to Continental Army soldiers in Rhode Island.

In 1780 Southwick received an honorary Master of Arts degree from Yale University.

Southwick later returned to Newport, where he resumed publishing the Mercury and served as Postmaster. In addition to publishing the Mercury, Southwick's printing business included the production of notes that were used as currency by America's fledgling banking industry.

== Death and burial ==
Solomon Southwick died in Newport on December 23, 1797. He was buried in Newport's Common Burying Ground. His gravestone is inscribed:

A gentleman of liberal education and expansive mind; for many years Proprietor & Editor of the Newport Mercury and Commissary General for the state of Rhode Island in the Revolutionary War.

== Family ==
Southwick was married to Ann Gardner Carpenter (1748-1783), the widow of Willett Carpenter and daughter of Lieutenant Governor John Gardner. They had four sons and a daughter, and their children included Solomon Southwick (1773-1839), a prominent newspaper publisher in Albany, New York and founder of the Anti-Masonic Party.

== Legacy ==
Southwick was the subject of a biography, 2001's Solomon Southwick, 1731-1797: Patriotic Printer of Rhode Island by C. Deirdre Phelps.

The press used by Solomon Southwick to print copies of the Declaration of Independence can be seen in the Museum of Newport History.

The home Southwick built in 1760, a 13-room colonial, still stands in Newport. It is a privately owned residence, and its address today is 77 Third Street.
