= Thomas Dawes =

American judge

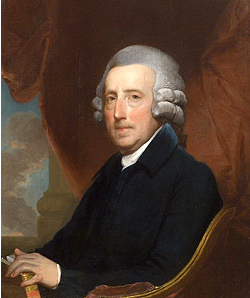
Portrait of Dawes by Gilbert Stuart, c. 1806. The book he is holding is Architecture by Palladio.

Coat of arms of Thomas Dawes

Thomas Dawes (August 5, 1731 – January 2, 1809) was a patriot who served as a Massachusetts militia colonel during the American Revolution and afterward assumed prominent positions in Massachusetts's government. His positions included membership and chairmanship of the Massachusetts Governor's Council and representative in both the House and Senate. As chairman of the Governor's Council, Dawes served briefly as the de jure presiding officer of the executive branch of Massachusetts' state government for ten days – May 20, 1800 to May 30, 1800 – following the death of first Governor Increase Sumner and then Lieutenant Governor Moses Gill. (See List of governors of Massachusetts.)

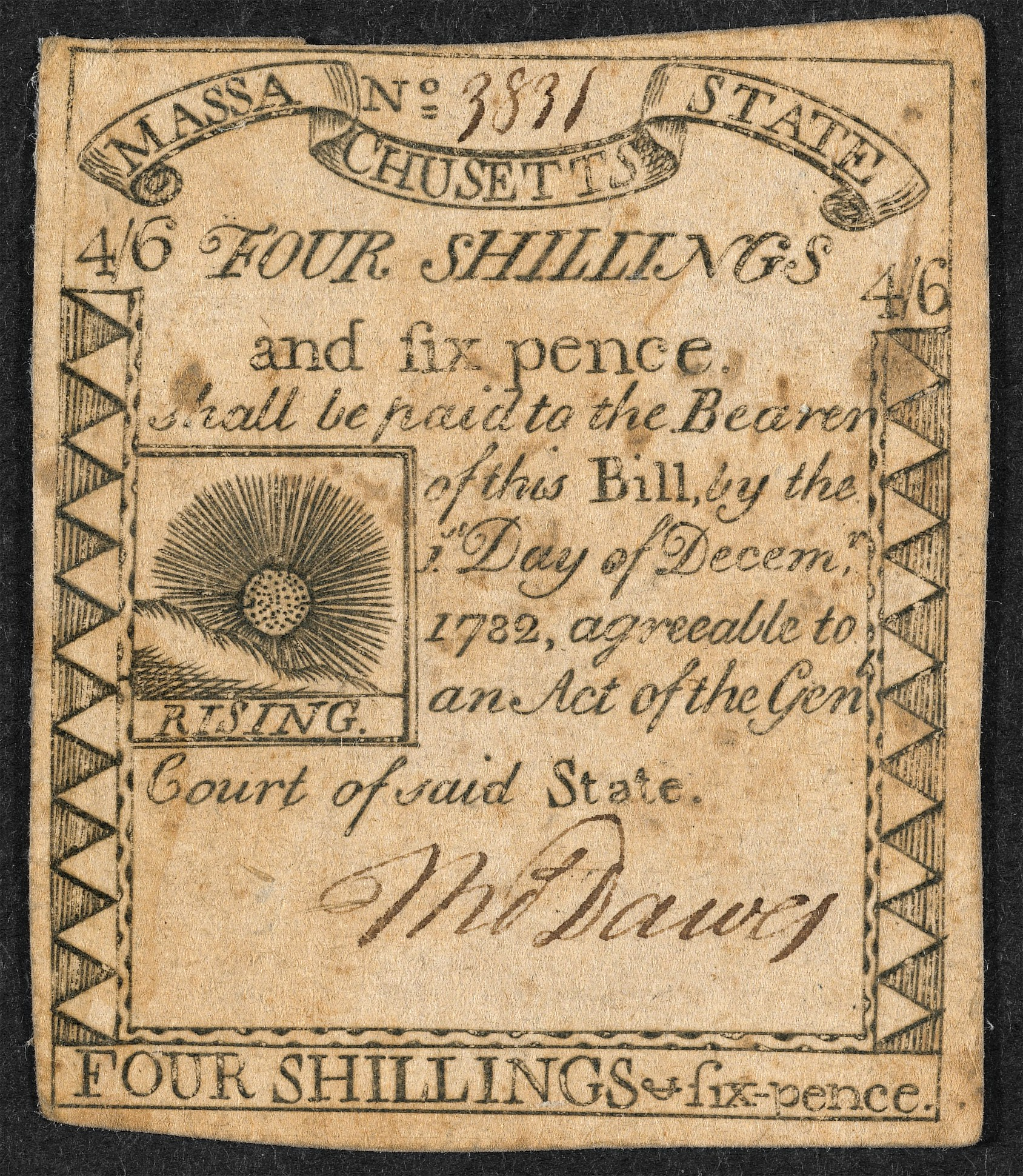
1782 Massachusetts currency bearing the signature of Thomas Dawes. Paul Revere did the engraving and printing of this "rising sun" currency. On the verso is an image of a pine tree, which was engraved (and sometimes printed) by another noted silversmith and engraver of the time, Nathaniel Hurd. Sometimes the recto would be printed by one printer and the verso by another.

Dawes was born in Boston. Prior to the Revolution, he attended a regular school and worked as a mechanic. He ardently supported the Whigs, gaining infamy among Royalists; his house was plundered by the British when they withdrew from Boston in 1776. Later, he became active in politics, lived in a roomy house on Purchase Street beside John Adams, and worked as an architect and builder designing many notable buildings in Boston, including the Brattle Street Church and repairs and/or modifications on the Old State House in about 1772.

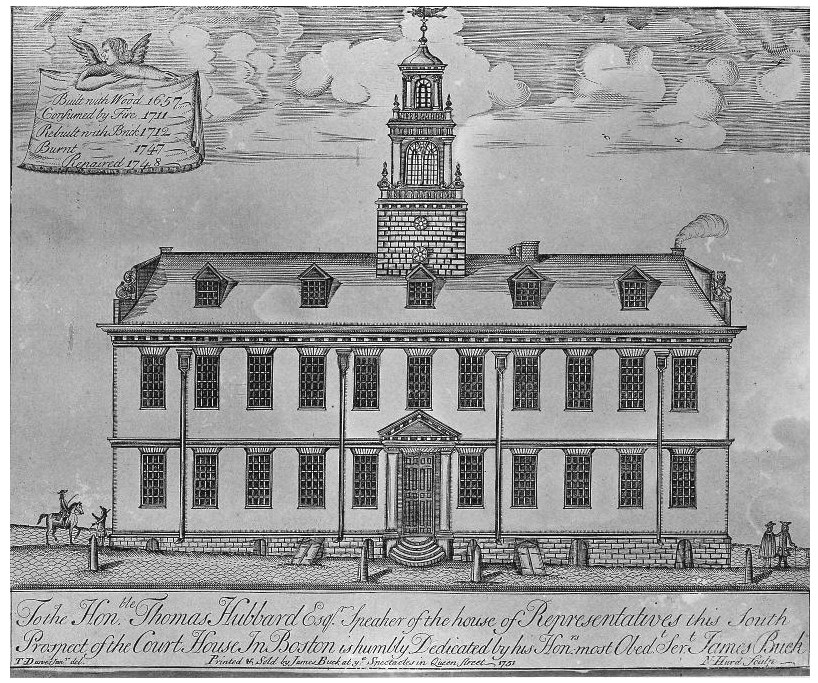
This elevation of Boston's Old State House was drawn by Thomas Dawes when he was 20 years old, and engraved by Nathaniel Hurd. This view shows the building's appearance after having been rebuilt after a fire gutted it in 1747.

He was the master builder for Hollis Hall at Harvard College and probably also designed the building. Only 11 days after the construction of Hollis Hall, a fire destroyed Old Harvard Hall, and in 1766, Thomas Dawes was again chosen as master builder, to replace this building. Three decades later Harvard again called upon him, this time to build Stoughton Hall. He helped build the Shirley-Eustis House for Governor William Shirley. He was elected a Fellow of the American Academy of Arts and Sciences in 1784. He attended Old South Church from 1786 until his death in 1809, and was a good friend of John Hancock.

Dawes, a member of the prominent Dawes family of Massachusetts Bay, was a cousin of the April 1775 Whig patriot William Dawes. He married Hannah Blake on July 1, 1752. Their son Thomas Dawes (July 8, 1757 – July 21, 1825) was a jurist and an alumnus of Harvard University, graduating in 1777, served in the Massachusetts ratifying convention for the United States Constitution in 1787-1788, and served in the Massachusetts Supreme Judicial Court from 1792 to 1802; he married Margaret Greenleaf. Through his son Thomas, Thomas Dawes was the 3rd great grandfather of the poet T.S. Eliot.

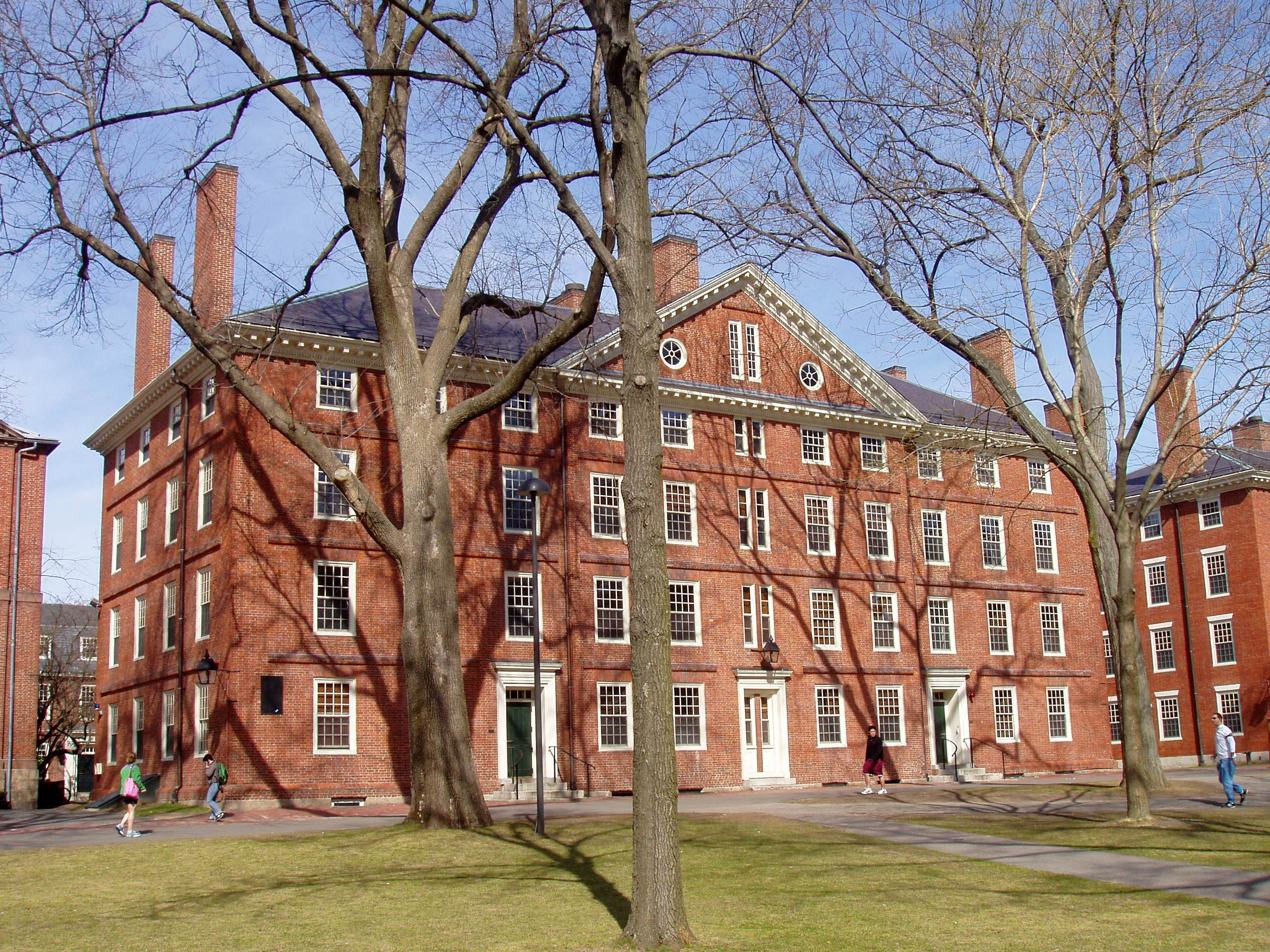
Hollis Hall, Harvard University

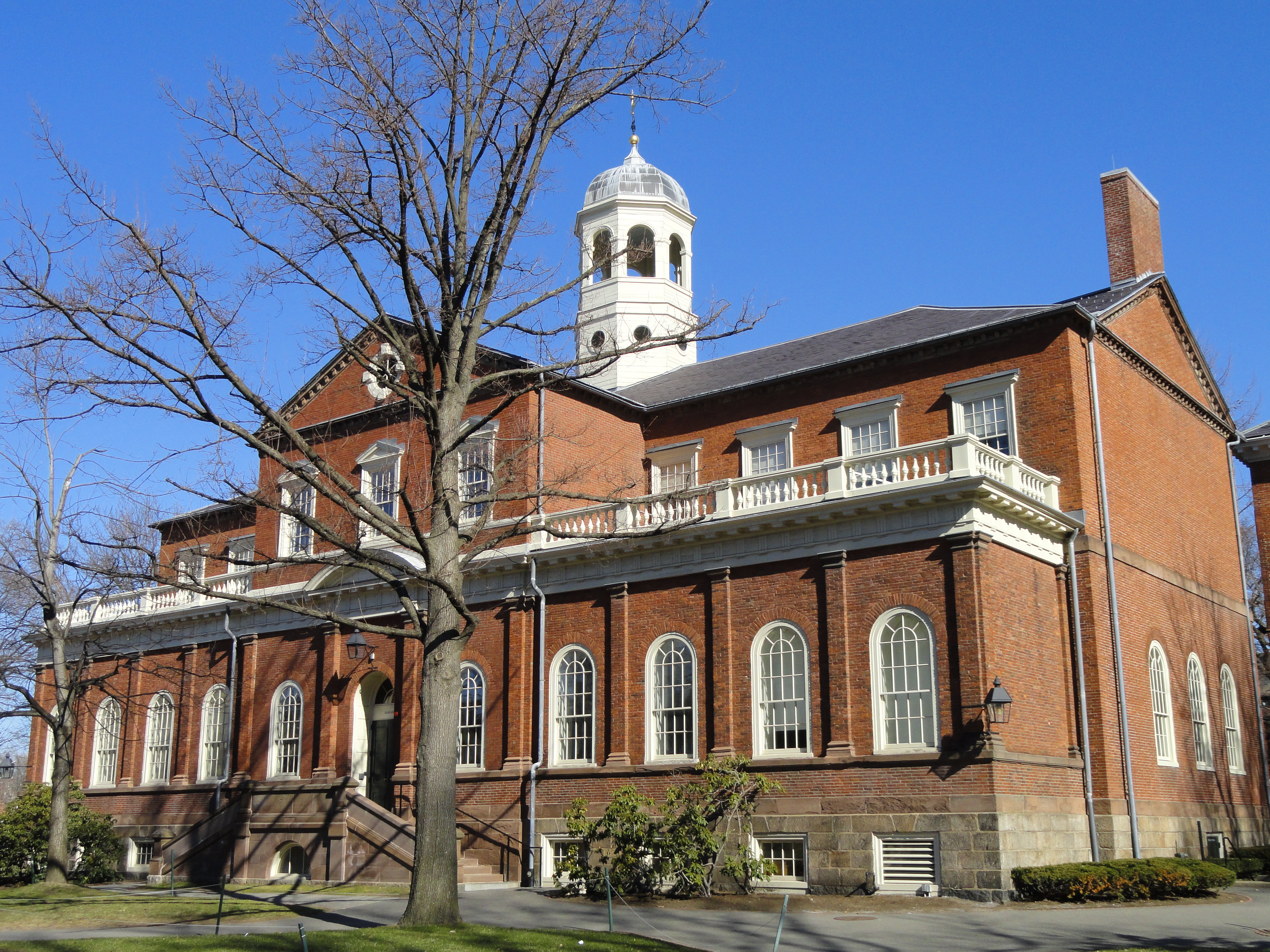
Harvard Hall, Harvard University

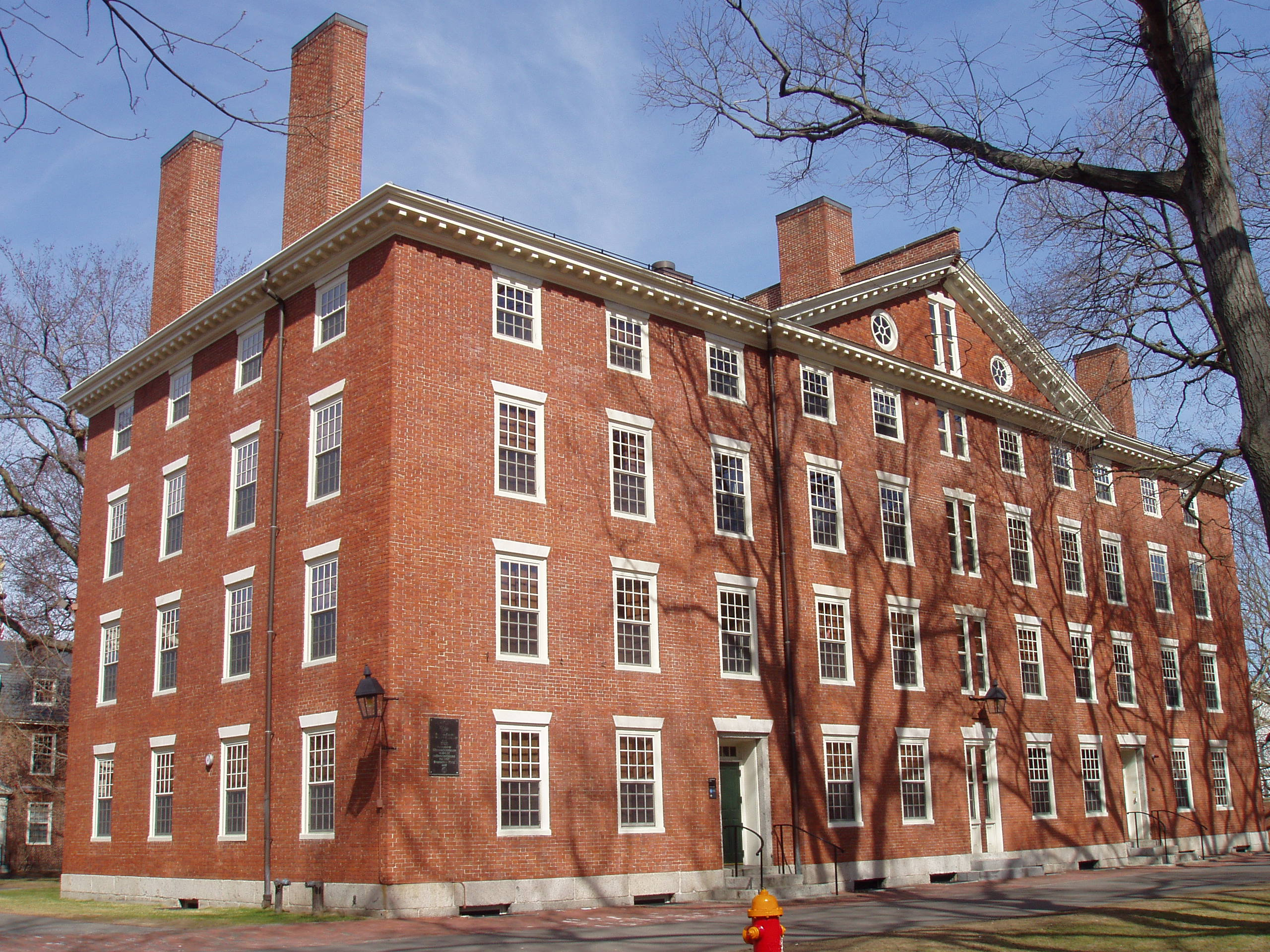
Stoughton Hall

Legal offices
Preceded by Francis Dana	Associate Justice of the Massachusetts Supreme Judicial Court; 1792–1802	Succeeded by Theodore Sedgwick
