= Nathaniel Hurd =

American engraver and silversmith

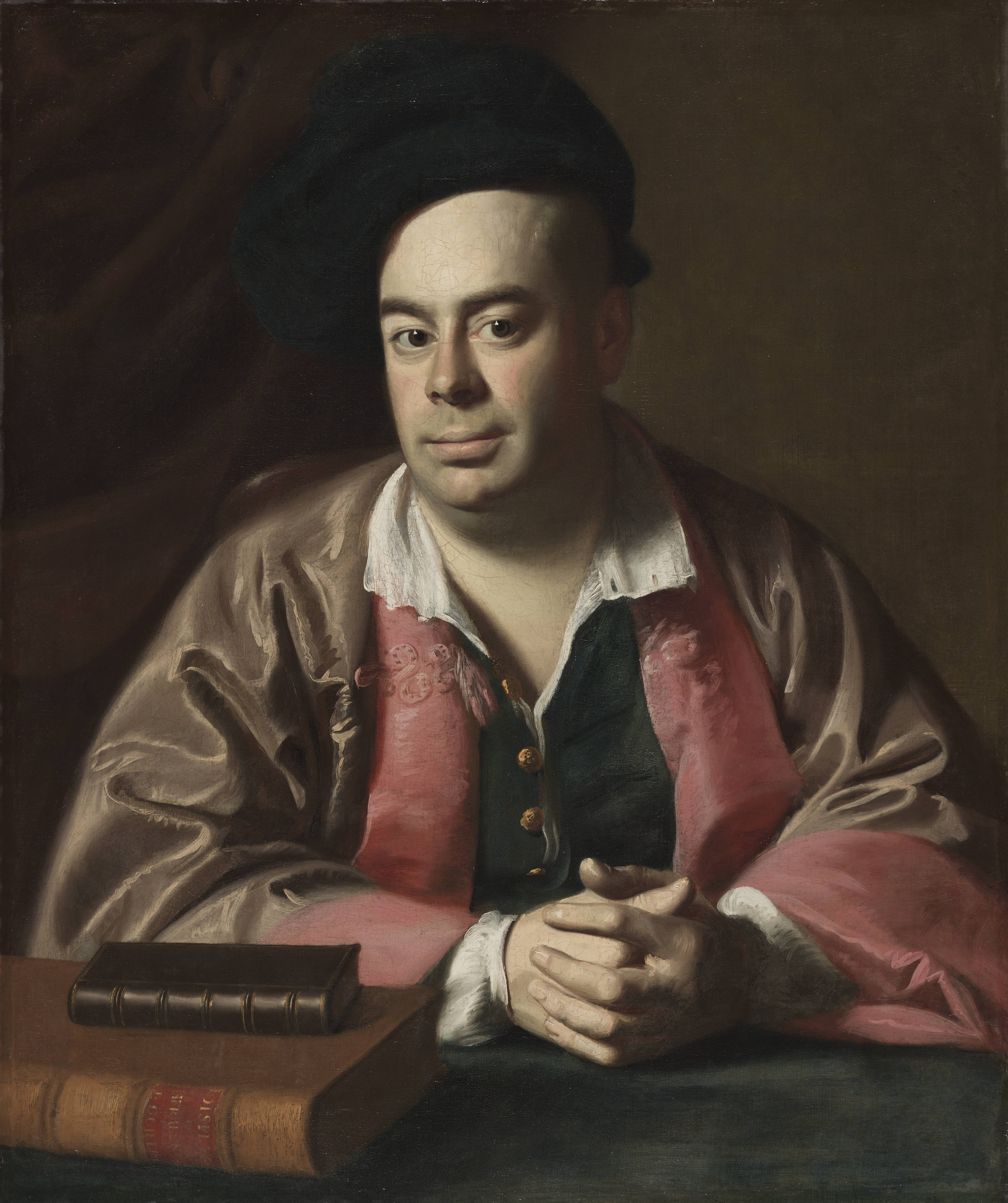
- Portrait of Nathaniel Hurd by John Singleton Copley, ca.1765 (Cleveland Museum of Art)
- Born: February 13, 1730; Boston, Province of Massachusetts Bay
- Died: December 17, 1777 (aged 47); Boston, Province of Massachusetts Bay
- Occupations: engraver and silversmith

Nathaniel Hurd (13 February 1730 – 17 December 1777) is recognized as the first American engraver and a silversmith in Boston, Massachusetts, in the 18th century. He engraved "bookplates ... heraldic devices, seals, ... paper currency, and business cards" along with die engravers and engravers on copper.

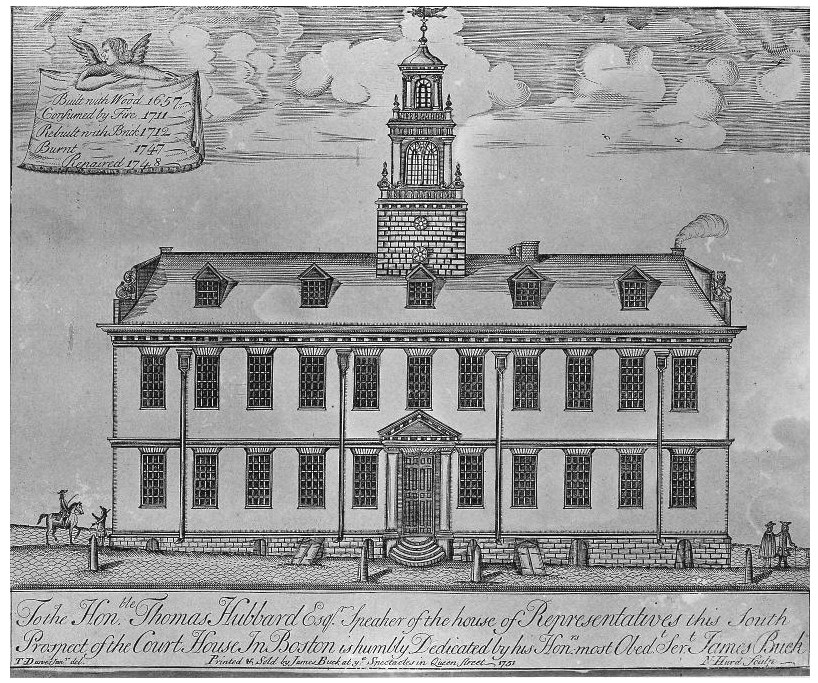
This elevation of Boston's Old State House was drawn by Thomas Dawes and engraved by Hurd, after the building was rebuilt after a 1747 fire.

== Early life and family ==
Hurd's grandfather had come from England and settled in Charlestown. He died in 1749 at the age of 70.

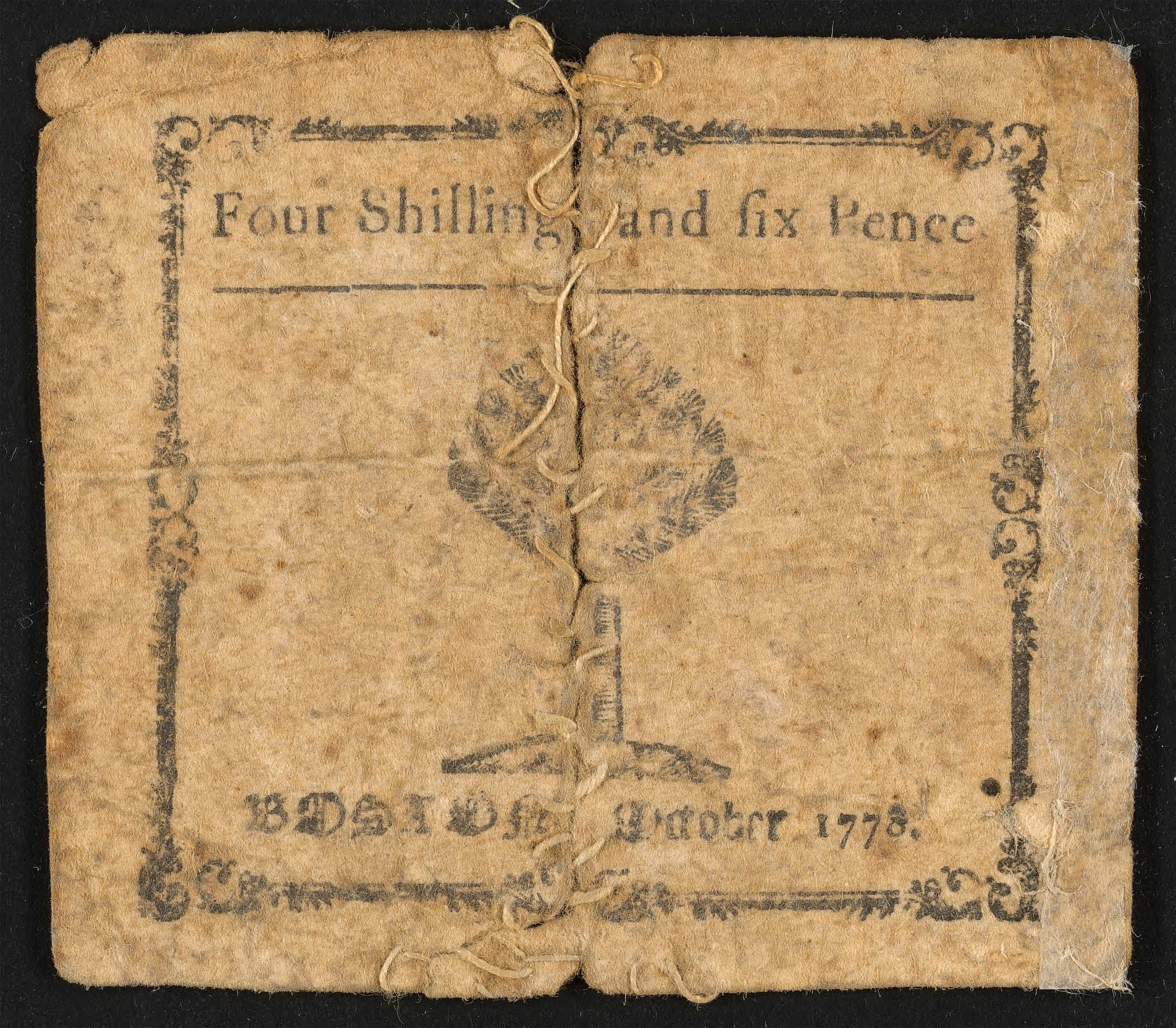
The pine tree on this 1778 Massachusetts currency was engraved by Hurd. This is the verso (back) side of the bill, which was printed by Thomas Fleet. The recto (front) was engraved and printed by Paul Revere and signed by Thomas Dawes. This bill was repaired by sewing with white thread

Hurd's father was Jacob Hurd, a leading Boston silversmith, whose works are in the collections of the Peabody Essex Museum, Cleveland Museum of Art, Strawbery Banke Museum, and the Museum of Fine Arts, Boston. Jacob Hurd married a daughter of John Mason (of Kingston, Jamaica who died in 1758).

== Career ==
An obituary from Amos Doolittle noted Hurd was the first to have engraved copper in the United States.

The lion rampant logo for Phillips Exeter Academy is taken from a bookplate Hurd designed for John Phillips in 1775.

=== Works ===
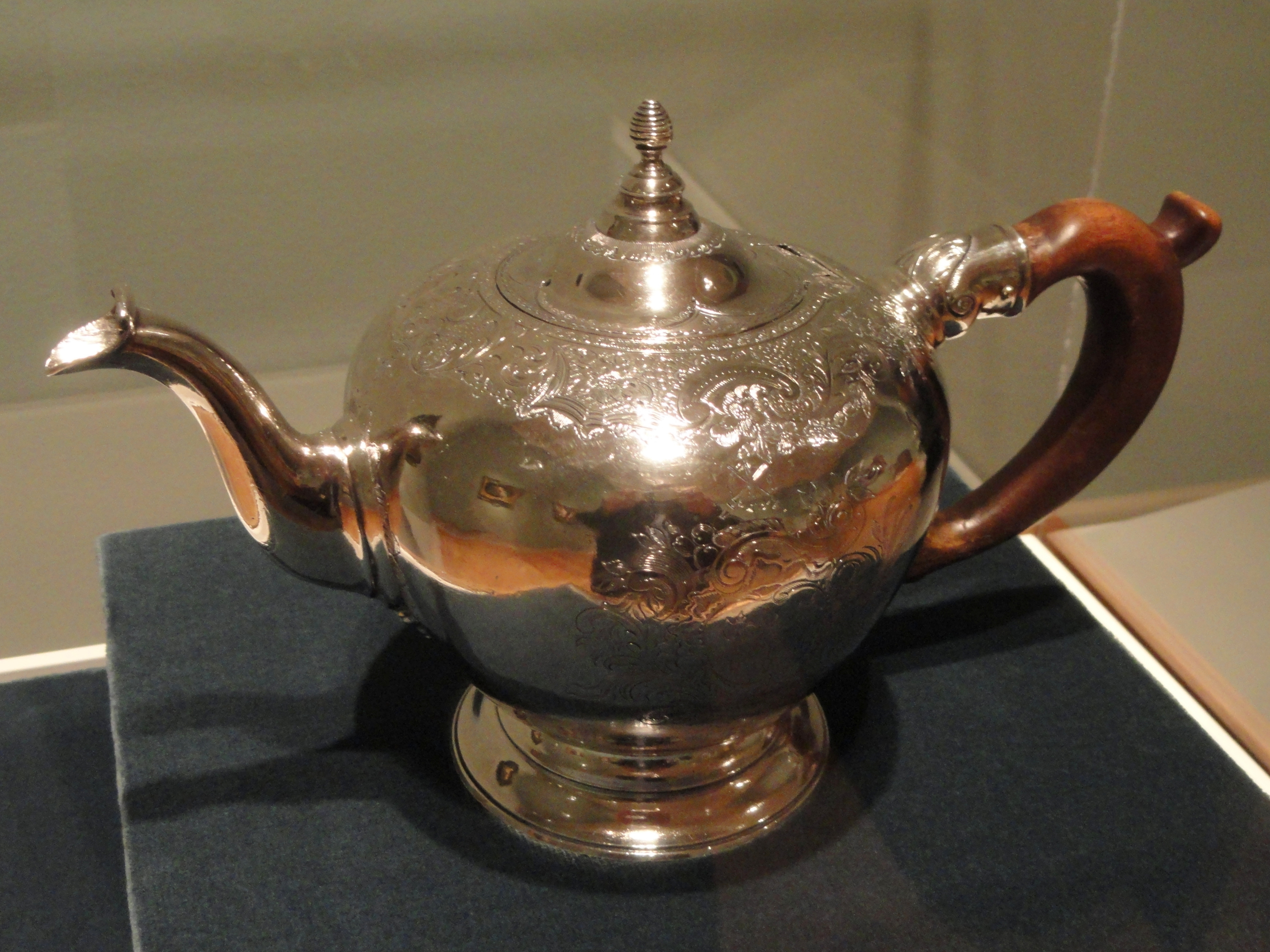
Silver teapot made by Hurd in the collection of the Cleveland Museum of Art

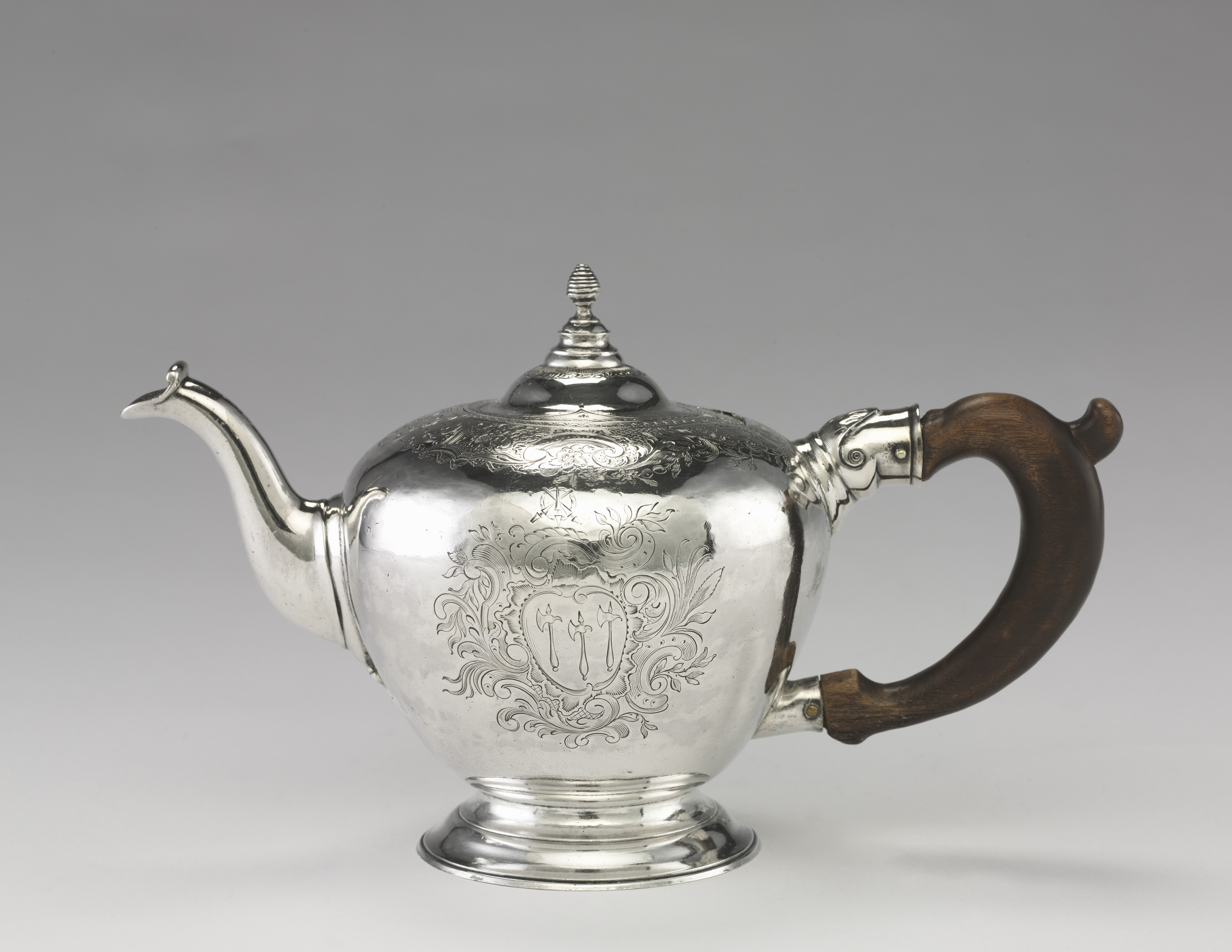
Silver teapot forged and engraved by Hurd

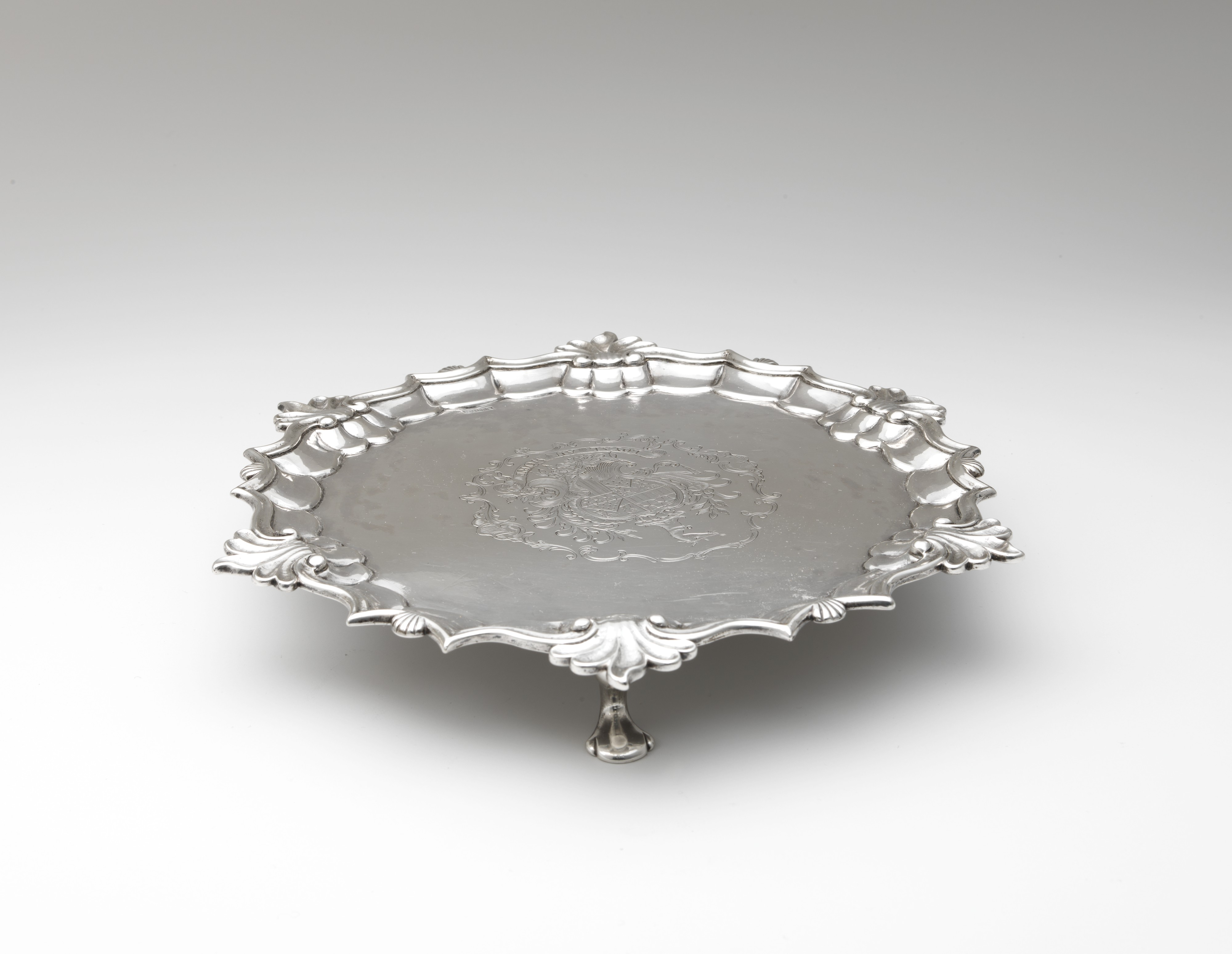
Salver (tray)

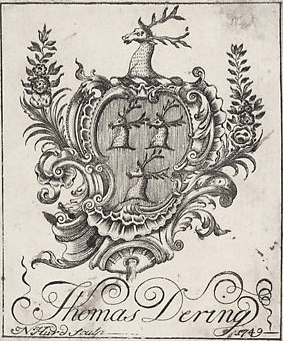
Armorial bookplate

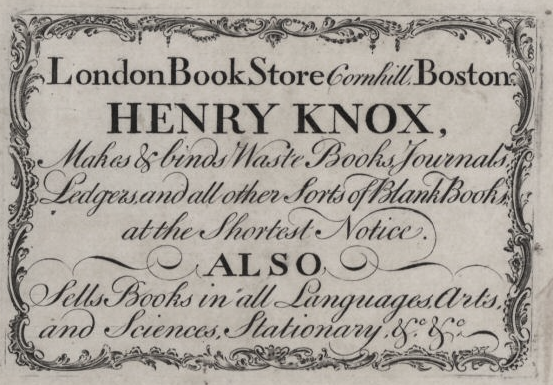
Trade card

== Later life and legacy ==
Coat of Arms of Nathaniel Hurd

Hurd died on 17 Dec 1777 and is buried in the old Granary Burial Ground in Boston.

Examples of Hurd's work are in the collections of Harvard University; Yale University; Historic Deerfield; the Lexington Historical Society; and the Museum of Fine Arts, Boston.
