= Daniel Henchman =

American silversmith

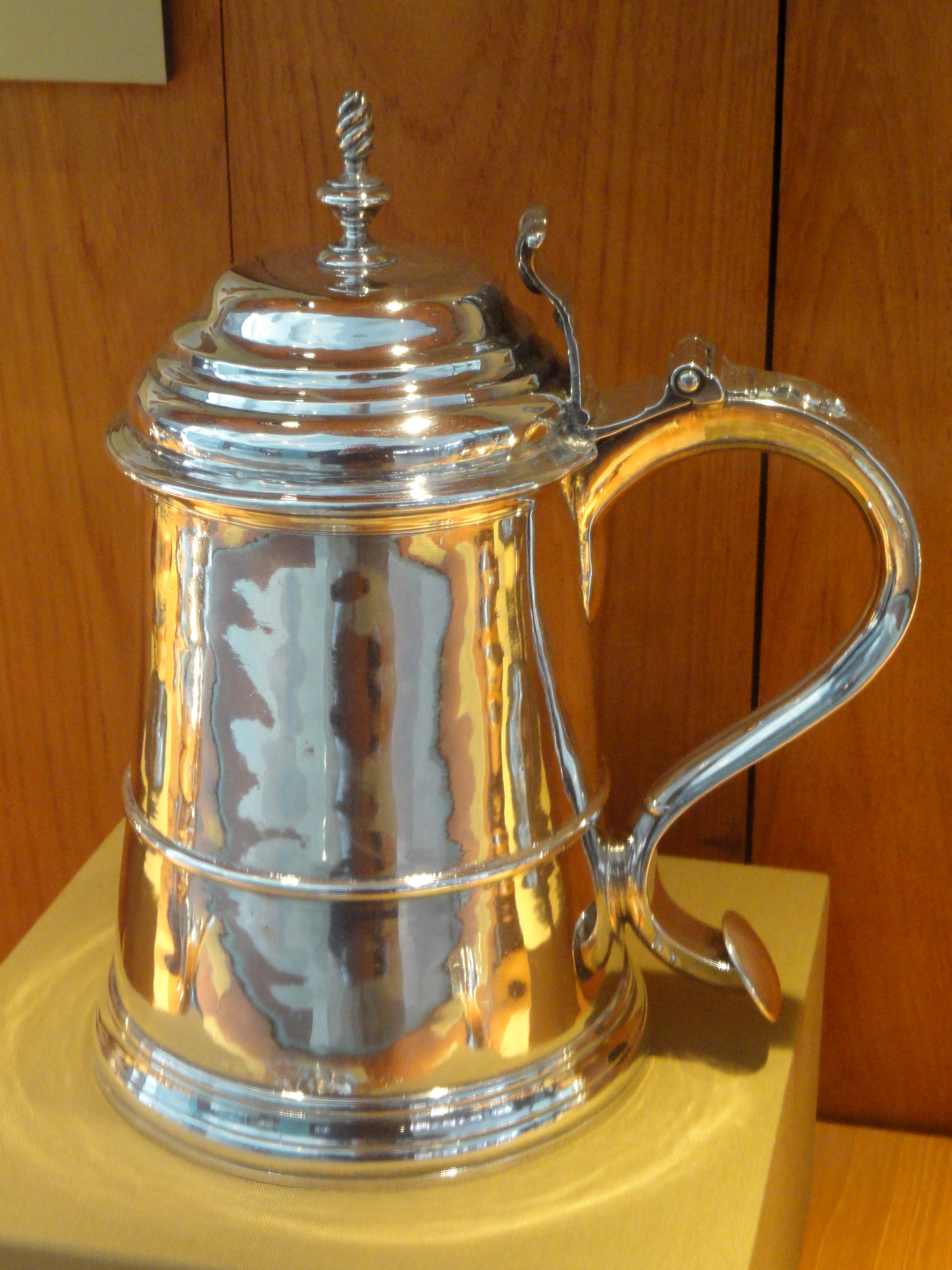
Tankard by Daniel Henchman, 1760-1770

Daniel Henchman (November 23, 1730 – January 7, 1775) was a colonial American silversmith, active in Boston, Massachusetts. He was born in Lynn, Massachusetts as the son of Rev. Nathaniel Henchman, apprenticed to silversmith Jacob Hurd, and married Elizabeth Hurd on March 20, 1753. Henchman advertised in the Boston Evening-Post, January 4, 1773, and again in the New England Chronicle for June 12, 1773: "Daniel Henchman Takes this Method to inform his customers in Town and Country That ... he makes with his own Hands all Kinds of large and small Plate Work, in the genteelest Taste and Newest Fashion, and of the purest Silver; and ... he flatters himself that he shall have the Preference by those who are best Judges of Work, to those Strangers among us who import and sell English Plate to the great Hurt and Prejudice of the Townsmen who have been bred to the Business... Said Henchman therefore will engage to those Gentlemen and Ladies who shall please to employ him, that he will make any kind of Plate they may want equal in goodness and cheaper than they can import from London, with the greatest Dispatch."
