= Newport Mercury =

Early American newspaper

- First issue of the Newport Mercury
- Type: Weekly newspaper
- Format: Broadsheet
- Owner: Gatehouse Media
- Founder: James Franklin
- Publisher: The Newport Daily News
- Founded: June 19, 1758
- City: Newport, Rhode Island

The Newport Mercury was an early American colonial newspaper founded in 1758 by Ann Smith Franklin (1696–1763), and her son, James Franklin (1730–1762), the nephew of Benjamin Franklin. The newspaper was printed on a printing press imported by Franklin's father, James Franklin (1697–1735), in 1717 from London. The Mercury may be the first newspaper published by a woman in the colonial United States. The Mercury was the also first paper to publish poetry by an African American woman, Phillis Wheatley.

The Mercury was published regularly up to the time the British Army occupied Newport in December 1776, when the press and types were buried. After the British evacuated Newport in November 1779, the Mercury was issued again.

Since the Mercury ceased publication during the Revolutionary War, and was acquired by Edward A. Sherman in 1928, Hartford Courant (founded 1764) and the Mercury's publisher have a longstanding debate over which is older. The Courant has long identified itself as the longest "continuously published" newspaper in the United States and most scholarly articles attribute it as such.

== Printing press history ==
=== James Franklin, 1717–1735 ===
About 1717 in Boston, James Franklin, (1697–1735) began printing on a press he had imported from London. In 1727, Franklin and his wife, Anne (1696–1763), joined his brother John (1690–1756), already established as a soap maker, in Newport, Rhode Island. Beginning in August of that year, Franklin began printing almanacs and the newspaper The Rhode Island Gazette, Rhode Island's first newspaper, which ran for a year.

=== Ann Franklin, 1735–1748 ===
When James Franklin died in 1735, his wife, Ann Franklin, took over the press, printing her first solo publication, A Brief Essay on the Number Seven, becoming one of the first female printers in the colonial United States. George Parker Winship wrote of the transition; "there is nothing in the appearance of the books which bear her name to show that her husband was seriously missed in the conduct of the establishment. She and her daughters had been accustomed to help in the type setting, so the actual change of office force was probably slight." Franklin continued to print almanacs and eventually became the official printer of the Colony of Rhode Island from 1736 until her death in 1763.

=== James Franklin, 1748–1763 ===
James and Anne Franklin's son, James (1730–1762), had been apprenticing in the printing trade with his uncle, Benjamin. The younger Franklin returned to Newport in 1748 to take over proprietorship of the printing press, taking on similar contracts with the colony, printing their proceedings or "schedules" for distribution from 1747 to the autumn of 1759.

James Franklin published the first issue of The Newport Mercury on June 19, 1758. For the first year the title was The Newport Mercury and Weekly Advertiser, and the newspaper was printed in basement of the school house at the center of Newport's Washington Square. Franklin died in 1762, and his mother, Anne, resumed management of the press with Samuel Hall, publishing under the name of Franklin & Hall. When Anne died in 1763, Hall became the sole proprietor, and began publishing The Newport Mercury under his name.

=== Samuel Hall, 1763–1768 ===
Samuel Hall (1740–1807) was born in Medford, Massachusetts, and had made a name for himself as a printer before moving to Newport in the 1750s. At some point in 1755, Hall had a child, Elizabeth, with daughter of Anne and James Franklin, Sarah (1734–1763). Genealogist Michael Leclerc speculates that Elizabeth Hall was born out of wedlock, writing that "Neither the civil records nor the records of the First Congregational Church of Newport show this marriage nor the birth or baptism of their daughter. The 'marriage' was likely a polite fiction to hide the fact that the child was illegitimate. ... Samuel Hall and Sarah [Franklin] never married."

According to another newspaper publisher from Worcester, Massachusetts, Isaiah Thomas; "Under the management of Hall, the Mercury made a more respectable appearance than before. It was printed handsomely and correctly; its columns were filled with well selected intelligence from the papers printed in the neighboring colonies, and due attention was paid to domestic information. Advertising customers increased, and its circulation became more extensive.

=== Solomon Southwick, 1768–1787 ===
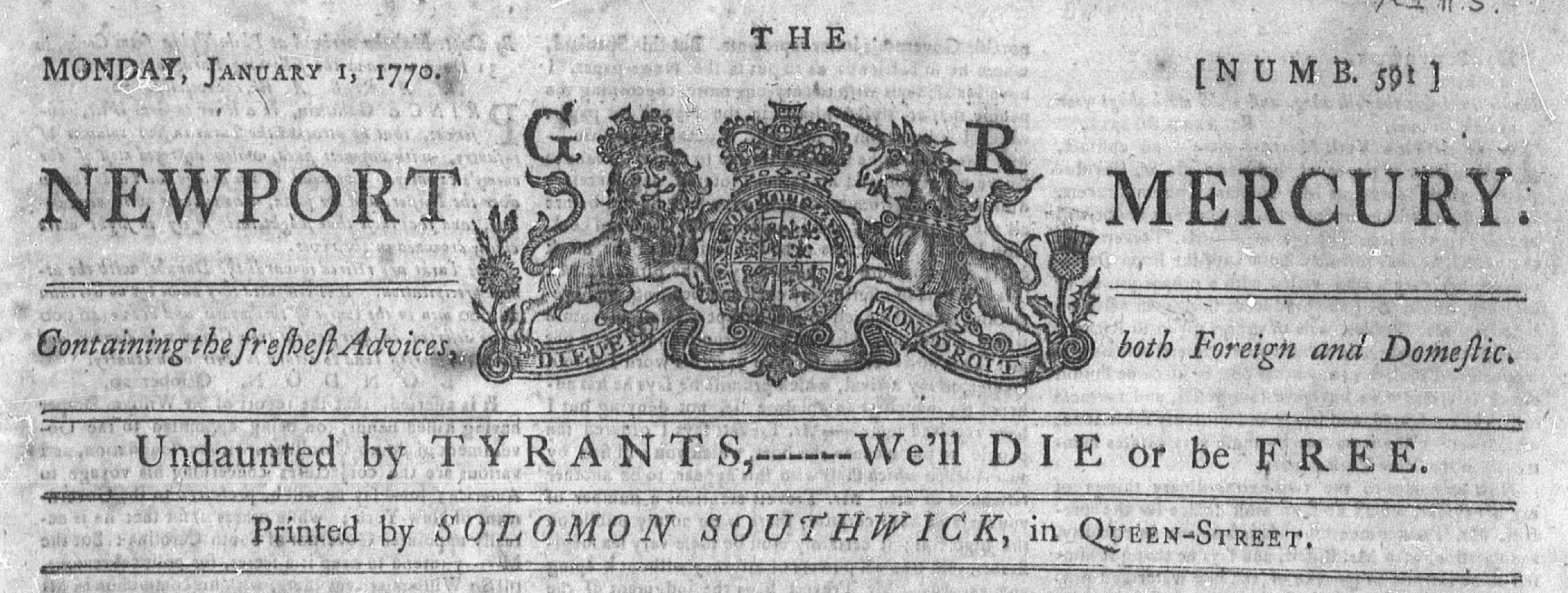
The Newport Mercury, January 1, 1770

In 1768, Hall sold the printing press to Solomon Southwick, who ran the newspaper in Newport until the British occupied Aquidneck Island in 1776. Before leaving the island, Southwick buried the printing press and movable types to prevent the British forces from using them. It was dug up, however, and used by the British to print The Newport Gazette for three years–from 1776 until its last issue on October 6, 1779. The press, also used by Solomon Southwick to print copies of the Declaration of Independence in 1776, can be seen in the Museum of Newport History in downtown Newport.

During the war, Southwick set up another press in Attleboro, Massachusetts, and from there published The Newport Mercury until his return to Newport in 1780, printing on "Queen Street, near the Middle of the Parade." According to publisher Isaiah Thomas, "Southwick continued the Mercury on the respectable ground on which it was placed by Hall; and, during the contest for the independence of our country, he conducted it with firmness and patriotic zeal."

=== Henry Barber, 1780–1800 ===
As soon as Southwick returned to Newport, Rhode Island, he began publishing jointly with another printer, Henry Barber. Barber was born in England, and learned printing from Southwick probably beginning sometime in 1780. George Parker Winship writes that Southwick and Barber "appear to have been more or less friendly rivals." Beginning on July 15, 1780, Southwick and Barber published the Mercury and other publications together until Southwick's retirement in 1787. Henry Barber published the newspaper on his own until his death in 1800. Barber's family continued publishing the Mercury uninterruptedly for almost fifty years, until 1850.

== Runaway slave advertisements, 1758–1792 ==
By the middle of the eighteenth century, the Colony of Rhode Island, and the city of Newport within it, had secured their role as the predominant carrier of enslaved Africans to the shores of what would become the United States. In fact, historian Jay Coughtry has said that what we know as the ‘American slave trade’ may be better termed the ‘Rhode Island slave trade.’ Knowing this, it is no surprise that Newport's Black population, by percentage of total population, was the largest in New England. While in the eighteenth century, several of the Africans and African Americans in Newport were free and even owned property (see: Kingston Pease), the vast majority of them were enslaved, forced to labor in the seaside market economy. While these free and enslaved people organized together publicly in the latter half of the eighteenth century in the form of mutual aid societies like the Free African Union Society, the historical record also reveals countless instances of Black people resisting their enslavement by running away.

Runaway Slave Ad, The Newport Mercury, May 12, 1792

Newspapers like the Mercury, first published in 1758, played a vital role in upholding the institution of slavery by publishing advertisements for slave auctions and runaway slave ads in their weekly editions. New England’s first newspaper, the Boston News Letter, carried advertisements of slaves as early as 1704, with it eventually becoming ubiquitous in newspapers like the Mercury or the News Letter–appearing in almost every issue. The prevalence of these runaway ads may also indicate, however, that these enslaved individuals used flight as a regular means of resisting enslavement in Rhode Island. Between 1760 and 1766 alone, seventy seven enslaved people were recorded in ads having fled from their captivity–that’s at least twelve people a year just as recorded in runaway ads.

These ads were originally meant as a tool to capture people fleeing from their enslavement. Now, we can now use them as a vital resource to learn more about the enslaved population of Newport, Rhode Island, and New England at large, information that other historical records often leave out. Very specifically, these ads reveal the persistence of Black people to resist their captivity in the North, and their drive to change their situations for something better for themselves. The gendered nature of flight as a means of resistance is also revealed–the record reveals that Black female runaways were almost non-existent. Historian Stephanie Camp cites “family responsibilities” as a reason why enslaved women were often hesitant to flee plantations in the South. However, a 1792 runaway ad in the Mercury described “a Negro Woman, named Kate Grealy … aged about 22 years” who had fled with her “young Child 3 Weeks old,” revealing how these responsibilities could also lead to flight, rather than prevent it.

== Recent history ==
In 1928, The Newport Mercury was acquired by Edward A. Sherman, owner of the Newport Daily News. It continued as a subscription weekly published by the Newport Daily News until March 2005, when it was relaunched as a free alternative newsweekly under the editorship of Janine Weisman. The current iteration of the paper covers arts, entertainment, food and culture in Newport County.

In April 2018, it was announced by editor Janine Weisman that the Mercury would no longer publish a weekly print edition, effective with the April 27 issue. The paper would continue as a monthly insert of the Newport Daily News. The first of these new monthly Mercury editions was published on June 7, 2018, as both an insert in the Newport Daily News and as a stand-alone free newspaper. This monthly edition of the Mercury was no longer being published by the time Weisman left the Daily News in August 2019.
