= The Essex Gazette =

Weekly newspaper in Massachusetts, US

The Essex Gazette

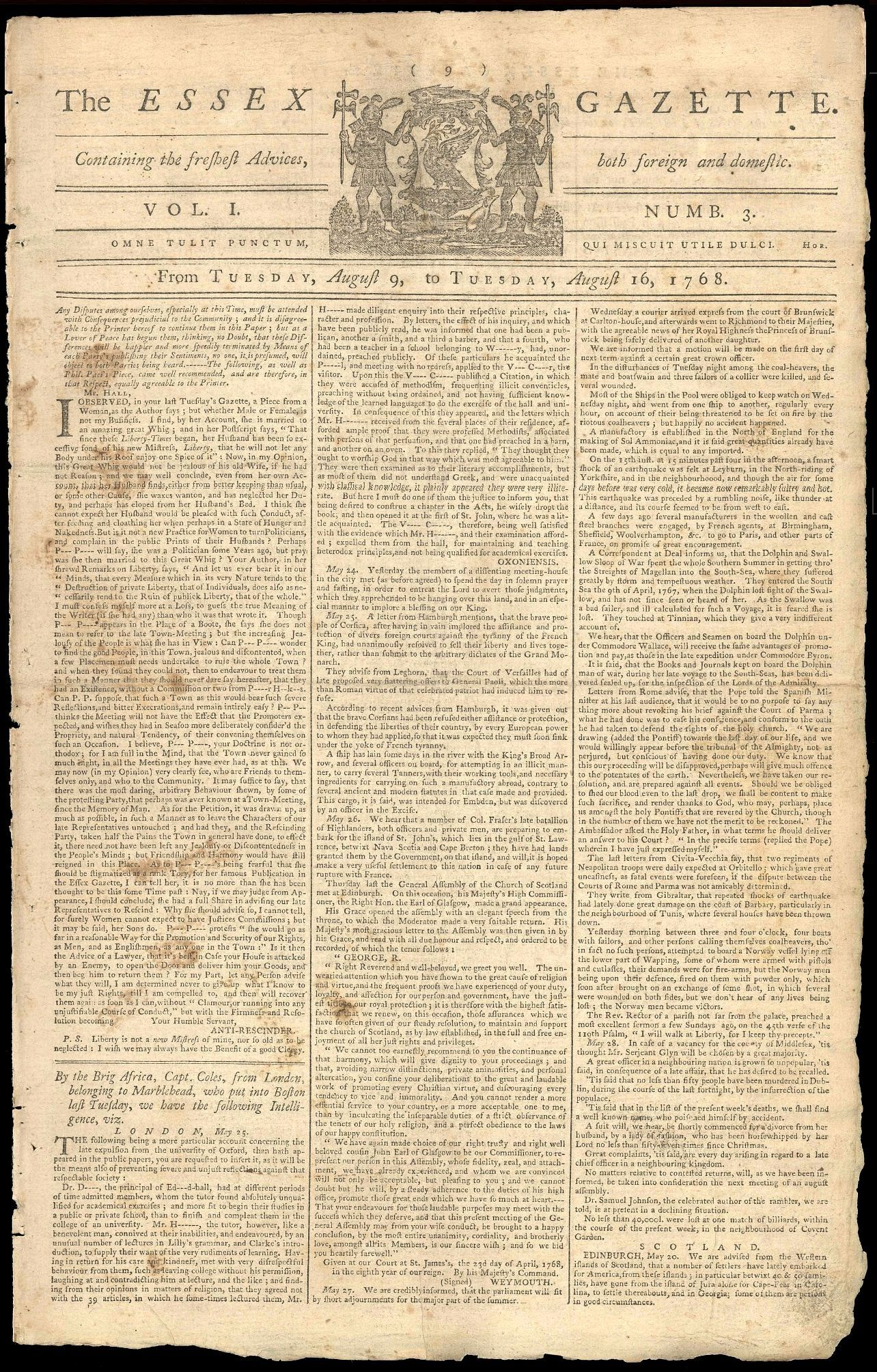
The Essex Gazette
August 9, 1768

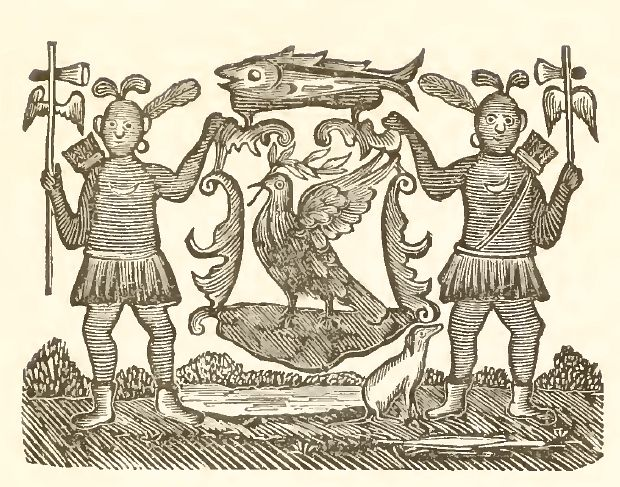
Detail of emblem in the header

The Essex Gazette was a weekly newspaper established in 1768 by Samuel Hall in Salem, Massachusetts, as the city's first newspaper and the first published in Massachusetts outside Boston, the colony's capital. it was the third newspaper to appear in Massachusetts. From its start, the newspaper was a strong proponent of American independence. The Gazette was relocated to Cambridge in 1775 following the outbreak of the American Revolutionary War with the Battles of Lexington and Concord. In early 1776, after the British army was driven from Boston, Hall moved the Gazette to the city, changing its name to The New England Chronicle.

== History ==
Samuel Hall, at the age of twenty-six, announced that he was about to open a printing shop in Salem in April 1768. Salem became the third place in the province of Massachusetts in which a press and a newspaper were established. The Gazette's first issue was published August 2, 1768. (Note: Accounts of the first publication vary. Frederic Hudson fixes the date of first publication at August 5.) A copy of the first issue is preserved and housed at the Essex Institute in Salem. At the commencement of its publication Hall on the front page of his Gazette declared his editorial policy, stating,

"I now commence the Publication of the ESSEX GAZETTE; ... I shall studiously avoid inserting any Pieces that can justly give Offence to Societies or Individuals: and with Regard to the Publishing of malicious personal Invectives, calculated to disturb the Peace and good Order of Society, or unjustly to injure the Character of any Individual, it is so repugnant to the Dictates of Justice, that no One, it is hoped, will be in the least apprehensive of its being practiced in this Gazette.
The Publick’s very humble,
And most obedient Servant,
Samuel Hall.

Hall's policy, however, did not prevent him from voicing strong support for the patriot cause. On August 1, 1768, the Boston Non-importation agreement was signed by the majority of Boston's merchants, placing a boycott on imported British goods. Hall used The Essex Gazette throughout 1769 to identify and publicly condemn any merchants who failed to comply with the agreement. In December of that year, Hall named four residents of Marblehead, as merchants who ignored the agreement and continued to import goods from Britain.

After the third year of the Gazette's publication, Hall took on his younger brother, Ebenezer, as a partner. The two published their newspaper in Salem until 1775, when they relocated the print shop to Cambridge. The newspaper supported the cause of the colonies against what was considered the unjust measures of the British Parliament. The frequent articles which appeared in the Gazette were from the hand of Whig writers, with some of them written with great force.

On October 6, 1774 "The great Salem fire" destroyed the meeting house, numerous shops, homes and other structures in that city, including the Hall printing shop. (Note: Prior to the Revolution the custom-house records disappeared, possibly in the fire that consumed the custom-house, which would explain the lack of Salem's records prior to the Revolution.) Hall was able to save his printing press and some other wares minutes before the fire reached and destroyed the shop. He subsequently moved his printing operation to a large brick building nearby, owned by a Mr. Blaney, which also contained the office of the Custom House. With the help of friends and neighbors Hall soon resumed printing the Gazette, where, in the issue immediately following the fire, Hall gave thanks and tribute to all who gave him their help and support.

The Essex Gazette was issued for approximately seven years leading up to the Revolution, during a period when many significant events occurred. The burdensome taxes imposed by the King, the non-importation agreements, the Boston Massacre (1770), the Boston Tea Party (December 16, 1773), the 1774 Boston Port Act (one of five Intolerable Acts), the resultant town meetings, and the popular animosity and disregard for the British Crown and Parliament, were well covered by Hall's Gazette. Colonial historian Harriet Tapley notes that, "To scan the files is like reading at first hand the history of protesting Massachusetts during those years."

Shortly after the American Revolutionary War broke out in Lexington and Concord (April 19, 1775), by the advice of various members of the Massachusetts General Court, and other prominent men of the Whig party, the Hall brothers moved from Salem to Cambridge at Stoughton Hall at Harvard College with their printing equipment and continued publication of the Gazette, under the new title of The New England Chronicle. Hall, in May 1775, published a full account of the battle, along with an account of Leslie's invasion, in the Gazette. The last issue printed at the Salem shop was dated, May 2, 1775. The first issue appeared on May 12. This issue contained a letter from General Washington to various privately owned military companies in Virginia. It also featured essays from various London newspapers, a patriotic article from the Connecticut Courant, (Note: Also known as The Hartford Courant, is the largest daily newspaper in Connecticut, and is considered the oldest newspaper in the United States.) and assorted interesting articles of literary significance, along with more than a page of advertisements, mostly from Boston merchants. The Chronicle became an influential supporter of American independence. Ebenezer died on February 14, 1776, with the next issue appearing on February 22, 1776, although Samuel's name did not appear in heading until the issue of February 29. In 1776 the office, with its press and types, was again moved, this time to Boston.

== Bibliography ==
- Brigham, Clarence S. (1947). History and Bibliography of American Newspapers. Vol. I. American Antiquarian Society.
- Buckingham, Joseph Tinker (1850). Specimens of newspaper literature : with personal memoirs, anecdotes, and reminiscences. Vol. I. Boston : Charles C. Little and James Brown.
- Hudson, Frederic (1873). Journalism in the United States, from 1690 to 1872. New York, Harper & Brothers.
- Hurd, Duane Hamilton, ed. (1888). History of Essex County, Massachusetts, with biographical sketches of many of its pioneers and prominent men. Vol. I. Philadelphia, J. W. Lewis & Co.
- O'Brien, G. Patrick (Spring 2020). ""Gilded Misery": The Robie Women in Loyalist Exile and Repatriation, 1775–1790". Acadiensis. 49 (1). Acadiensis: Journal of the History of the Atlantic Region: 39–68. doi:10.1353/aca.2020.0001. JSTOR 26974488. S2CID 220495487.
- Tapley, Harriet Silvester (1927). Salem imprints, 1768-1825 : a history of the first fifty years of printing in Salem, Massachusetts, with some account of the bookshops, booksellers, bookbinders and the private libraries. Salem, Mass. : The Essex Institute.
- Thomas, Isaiah (1874). The history of printing in America, with a biography of printers. Vol. I. New York, B. Franklin.
- —— (1874). The history of printing in America, with a biography of printers. Vol. II. New York, B. Franklin.
