= Ann Smith Franklin =

American colonial newspaper printer and publisher

- Born: Ann Smith; October 2, 1696; Boston, Province of Massachusetts Bay
- Died: April 16, 1763 (aged 66); Newport, Colony of Rhode Island and Providence Plantations
- Other name: "Widow Franklin"
- Occupation: Newspaper/Almanac Printer/Publisher
- Notable credit: America's first woman newspaper editor
- Spouse: James Franklin
- Children: 5

Ann Smith Franklin (October 2, 1696 – April 16, 1763) was an American colonial newspaper printer and publisher. She inherited the business from her husband, James Franklin, brother of Benjamin Franklin. She published the Newport Mercury, printed an almanac series, and printed Rhode Island paper currency. She was the country’s first female newspaper editor, the first woman to write an almanac, and the first woman inducted into the University of Rhode Island's Journalism Hall of Fame.

== Personal life ==
Ann Smith Franklin was married to James Franklin, a printer and the brother of Founding Father Benjamin Franklin.

They had five children including daughters Mary and Elizabeth, and son James Jr. (c.1730–1762). James Jr. attended Philadelphia Academy with his cousin William, Benjamin's son, before James Jr. was apprenticed in the printing trade to his uncle Benjamin. After a long illness, James died in Newport in 1735, leaving Ann a widow, aged 39, with three young children to support, one child having died earlier.

== Career ==
In 1736, Ann petitioned the General Assembly of Rhode Island, seeking printing work in order to support her family. She was awarded the contract, becoming the General Assembly's official printer to the colony, a position she held until she died. In this official capacity, she printed the colony's charter granted by Charles II of England. To supplement her income, she printed sermons for ministers, advertisements for merchants, as well as popular British novels. Ann's most notable work was compiling and publishing five editions of the Rhode Island Almanack, for the years 1737–1741. In 1741, she began selling her brother-in-law Benjamin's almanac, Poor Richard's Almanack, and in 1745, she printed 500 copies of the Acts and Laws of Rhode Island as a folio edition, her largest commission.

Though a second child died young, Mary, Elizabeth and James Jr. worked in the family business. The daughters performed typesetting while James Jr. ran the business, now called "Ann and James Franklin", with his mother. During this time, however, some of Ann's imprints continued to bear the name "Widow Franklin". In 1758, they published The Newport Mercury, Rhode Island's first newspaper.

== Later years ==
As Ann grew older, she turned over many business responsibilities to James Jr. After the deaths of her remaining children, Ann, then age 65, returned to the printing press. She took on the printer Samuel Hall, who had been her son-in-law, as her business partner in 1761, forming "Franklin & Hall". Under this imprint, they printed a folio of Rhode Island schedules.

Ann Smith Franklin died in 1763.

== Posthumous awards ==
- Journalism Hall of Fame, University of Rhode Island
- Yankee Quill Award, 2008
- Rhode Island Heritage Hall of Fame, 1998

== Partial works ==
=== Almanacs ===
- Stafford, J. (1736). The Rhode Island almanack for the year, 1737. ... Fitted to the meridian of Newport, on Rhode-Island, whose latitude north is 41 gr. 30 m. longitude from London, 72 grs. Newport [R.I.]: Printed and sold by the Widow Franklin, at the town school-house. OCLC 62819626
- Stafford, J. (1737). The Rhode-Island almanack for the year, 1738. ... Fitted to the meridian of Newport, on Rhode-Island, whose latitude north is 41 gr. 30 m. longitude from London, 72 grs. but may without sensible error, serve from New Found-land [sic] to South Carolina. Tides excepted. Newport [R.I.]: Printed and sold by the Widow Franklin, at the town school-house. OCLC 62819627
- The Rhode-Island almanack for the year, 1739 ... Fitted to the meridian of Newport, on Rhode-Island, whose latitude north is 41 gr. 30 m. longitude from London, 72 grs. But may without sensible error, serve from New-Found-Land to South Carolina. (1738). Newport [R.I.]: Printed and sold by the Widow Franklin at the town school-house. OCLC 55834986
- Franklin, A. (1739). The Rhode-Island almanack for the year, 1740.: ... Fitted to the meridian of Newport, on Rhode-Island, whose latitude north is 41 gr. 30 m. longitude from London, 72 grs. But may without sensible error, serve from New Found-land to South Carolina. Tides excepted. Newport [R.I.]: Printed and sold by the Widow Franklin, at the town school-house. OCLC 207876385
- The Rhode-Island almanack for the year, 1741. ... Fitted to the meridian of Newport, on Rhode-Island, whose latitude north is 41 gr. 30 m. longitude from London, 72 grs. But may without sensible error, serve from New Found-land to South Carolina. Tides excepted. (1740). Newport [R.I.]: Printed and sold by the Widow Franklin at the town school-house. OCLC 70091132

=== General Assembly of Rhode Island ===
- (1744). Acts and laws, of His Majesty's colony of Rhode-Island, and Providence-Plantations, in New-England, in America [1 March 1663 - 27 May 1745]. Newport: Printed by the Widow Franklin, and to be sold at the Town School-House. OCLC 18555959
- (1744). The charter granted by His Majesty, King Charles II to the Governor and company of the English Colony of Rhode-Island and Providence-Plantations, in New-England in America. Newport: Printed by the Widow Franklin. OCLC 5076592
- Franklin, J., & Franklin, A. S. (1759). An act for vesting and distributing intestate estates. Newport, R.I.: Printed by James Franklin. OCLC 5261454

=== British ===
- Deloney, T. (1746). Fai[r Rosamond] Ga[?...] who wa[s King Henry] the Seco[nd's concubine], and put [to death] by Queen [Elinor, i]n the bower of Woodstock, near Oxford. Newport [R.I.]: Printed and sold by the Widow Franklin, at the town school-house. OCLC 68587011
- Nathan ben Saddi, Dodsley, R., & Chesterfield, P. D. S. (1741). The chronicle of the kings of England, Written in the manner of the ancient Jewish historians. London, printed: Re-printed and sold by the Widow Franklin. OCLC 62565273

=== Religious ===
- Aplin, J. (1737). John Walton's religion, proved not to be the religion of Jesus. Or A confutation of sundry errors published by John Walton, gent. in his book entituled, the religion of Jesus vindicated. Newport [R.I.]: Printed by the Widow Franklin, for the author. OCLC 55821240
- Bowler, C., Franklin, J., & Franklin, A. S. (1758). Reflections on the conduct and principles of the Quakers in North-America. Newport, R.I.: Printed by James Franklin. OCLC 5215041

=== Franklin & Hall ===
- (1761). At the General Assembly of the governor and Company of the English colony of Rhode-Island, and Providence Plantations, in New-England, in America Begun and holden by adjournment, at Newport, within and for the said colony, on Tuesday the twenty-first day of September, in the year of our Lord, one thousand seven hundred and sixty-two, and second of the reign of His Most Sacred Majesty George the Third, by the grace of God, King of Great-Britain, and so forth. : An act for supplying the general treasury with the sum of eight thousand pounds lawful money, by levying a tax upon the inhabitants of this colony. OCLC 55828992
- (1762) Remarks on a late performance, sign'd, a freeman of the colony, in answer to a dialogue between the governor of the colony of Rhode-Island, and a freeman of the same colony. OCLC 55827610

== See also ==
- List of women printers and publishers before 1800
